= Outline of marketing =

Overview of and topical guide to marketing

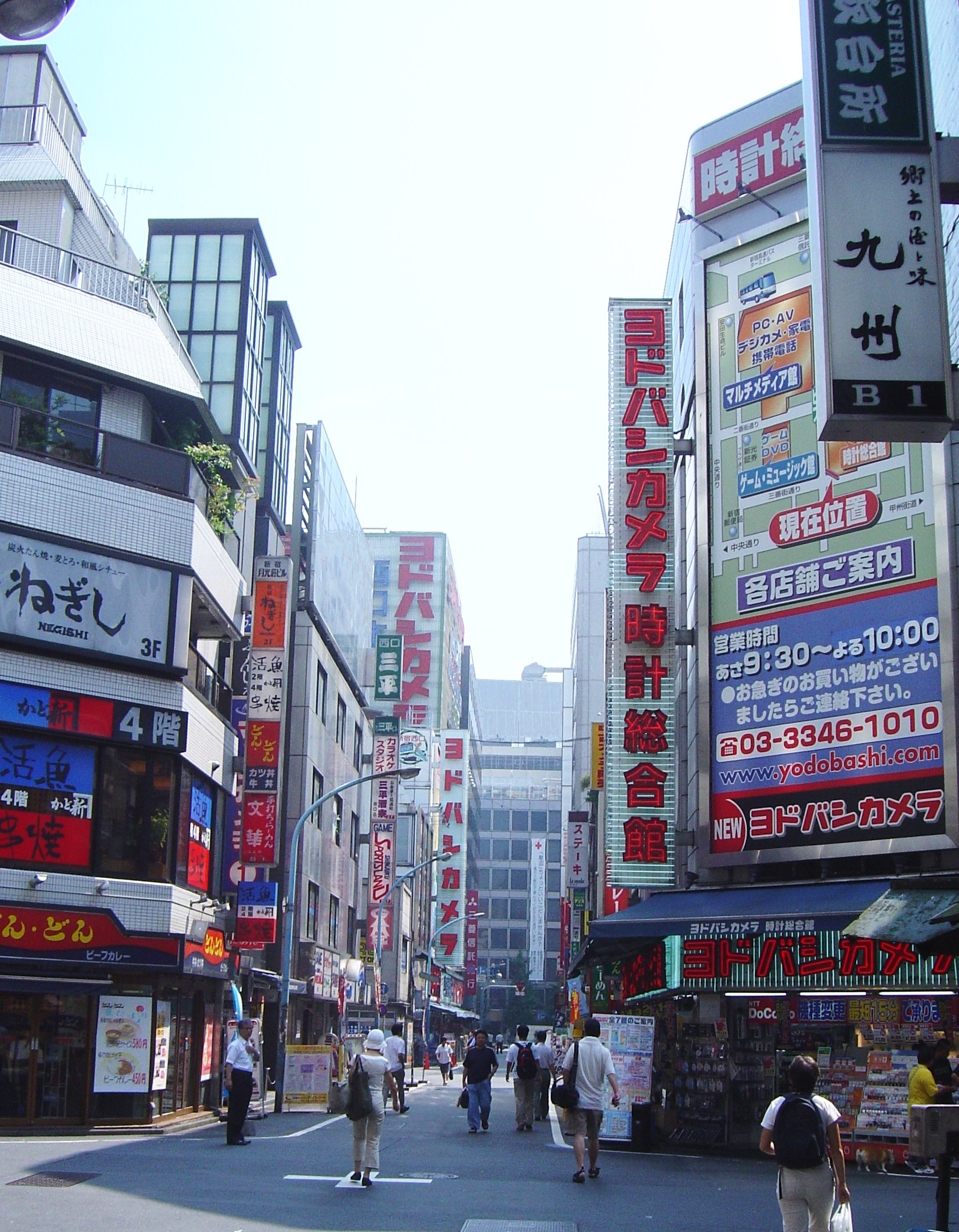
Billboards in Tokyo, Japan

Marketing refers to the social and managerial processes by which products, services, and value are exchanged in order to fulfill individuals' or groups' needs and wants. These processes include, but are not limited to, advertising, promotion, distribution, and product management. The following outline provides an overview and topical guide to the subject:

Marketers may sell goods or services directly to consumers, known as business to customer (B2C marketing), commercial organizations (known as business to business marketing or B2B), the government, not-for-profit organizations (NFP) or some combination of any of these.

== Actors and relationships ==
At the center of the marketing framework lies the relationship between the consumer and the organization with the implication that marketers must manage the way the organization presents its public face.

Consumer: Typically, the consumer refers to the end-user, but this may be an individual or group such as a household, family unit or organization. In addition, marketers may need to consider the roles of influencers such as opinion leaders who increasingly use means such as social media to develop customer to customer networks of influence.

Organization: may be represented by many different actors, including various sales personnel: agent, broker, sales representative, merchant, retailer, street vendor or vendor.

Selling situations: Depending on the nature of the business operations, many different types of actors are involved in a variety of selling situations involving a variety of sales personnel, who perform varied sales roles. Sales activities involve many different types of customer relationships—from simple transactional exchange to long-term, enduring customer relationships.

== Consumers ==
=== Customer demand ===
Marketers typically begin planning with a detailed understanding of customer needs and wants.

A need is something required for a healthy life (e.g. food, water, shelter, emotional bonding).
A want is a desire, wish or aspiration; when needs or wants are backed by purchasing power, they have the potential to become demands.

=== Exchange ===
Exchange, the act of giving or taking one thing of value in return for another, is central to marketing activities. Not all exchange involves financial transactions, but exchange may involve barter, contra dealing or other forms of trade. The object of exchange can include: goods, services or experiences, concepts or ideas, and causes, and may even involve celebrity marketing.

=== Perception of value ===
Traditional thinking around the concept of value was that marketers created value through innovation, product design and manufacture, and that utility was embedded in products or services offered for sale. In this type of thinking, a marketer's objective was to communicate a value proposition to potential buyers. However, recent thinking has changed the traditional perspective and now recognizes that consumers may participate in the co-creation of value in a variety of ways. Consumers may derive value through usage and experience, known as value-in-use or may be involved in product design, known as participatory design.

== Economic concepts ==
Given that marketing has its roots in economics, it shares many foundation concepts with the discipline. Most practicing marketers will have a working knowledge of basic economic concepts and theories.

=== Competitive and comparative advantages ===
Businesses seek to compete by achieving competitive advantages or comparative advantages. Competitive advantages often focus on reducing costs through achieving one or more of the following: economies of scope, economies of scale, experience effects and first-mover advantages. Alternatively, a business may seek to develop uniqueness through product differentiation or developing unique competencies such as market sensing, rapid market response or delivering superior customer value.

=== Competition types ===
Different types of competitive markets can be identified: duopoly, monopoly, monopolistic competition, imperfect competition, and oligopoly.

=== Demand ===
Understanding demand and supply is essential for determining market size and market potential as well as in the price-setting function.

The basic mechanics of consumer demand include: demand curve, demand-led growth, demand response, law of demand, law of supply and transaction costs.
Different types of demand functions include: derived demand and inverse demand function.

=== Economic systems ===
In Western economies, the capitalist economy dominates. However, other types of economic systems such as barter economies and the sharing economy can be identified.

=== Markets ===
- Market
- Monopsony
- Oligopsony

=== Value ===
- Value-in-ownership
- Value-in-use
- Marketing ethics

=== Switching ===
- Switching costs
  - Switching barriers

== Planning ==
Diagram of a marketing plan

=== Planning levels ===
Marketing planning is just one facet of the overall company's planning. Marketing plans must therefore take their guidance from the overall strategic plan or business plan. Most companies produce both a strategic plan and a managerial plan (also known as an operational plan). The distinction between strategic planning and management planning is that they are two phases with different goals.

Strategic planning is fundamentally concerned with the policies that will improve the firm's competitive position. Strategic planning is sometimes called higher-order planning and is usually long-term (say 3–7 years) while management planning is short-term and may be carried out for a specific program (e.g. a sales or advertising campaign of a few weeks duration) or carried out annually. Strategic plans typically include a statement of the firm's vision and mission. The marketing strategy is a plan that shows how the firm's marketing activities will help to achieve the overall strategic goals.

Marketing management or marketing mix (also known as the 4Ps) is focused on developing the marketing program and is concerned with the implementation of specific action plans designed to achieve objective, measurable targets (SMART objectives). Marketing management plans are typically prepared on an annual planning cycle, but may be prepared for shorter periods for special events such as a product launch, a new logo, change to corporate livery or a repositioning campaign.

=== Planning tools ===
Strategic planning requires sophisticated research and analysis to document the firm's current situation as well as to identify opportunities with the potential to be developed.

=== Planning methods ===
Strategic research is primarily concerned with the identification of new business opportunities and threats, which derive from the external operating environment. Accordingly, strategic analysts rely less on traditional market research methods. Instead, they use methods such as environmental scanning, marketing intelligence (also known as competitive intelligence) and futures research.

=== Analysis methods ===
Marketers draw on a very wide variety of techniques and tools when analyzing the market and the broader operating conditions. The technique selected depends on the nature of the situation or problem to be investigated and the analyst's skill and experience. Strategic analysts employ some 200 different quantitative and qualitative analytical techniques including:

Brand development index (BDI), category development index (CDI), brand/category penetration, benchmarking, blind spot analysis, functional capability and resource analysis, impact analysis, counterfactual analysis, demand analysis, emerging issues analysis, experience curve analysis, gap analysis, se analysis (also known as Porter's five forces analysis), management profiling, market segmentation analysis, market share analysis, perceptual mapping, PEST analysis or its variants including PESTLE, STEEPLED and STEER, portfolio analysis, such as BCG growth-share matrix or GE business screen matrix, positioning analysis, precursor analysis or evolutionary analysis, product life cycle analysis and S-curve analysis (also known as technology life cycle or hype cycle analysis), product evolutionary cycle analysis, scenario analysis, segment share analysis, situation analysis, strategic group analysis, SWOT analysis, trend analysis and value chain analysis.

=== Marketing strategies ===
- Barriers to entry
- Barriers to exit
- Market dominance strategies
- Mass customization
- Mission-driven marketing
- Porter's generic strategies
  - Cost leadership
  - Differentiation

=== Growth strategies ===
- Aggressiveness strategies
- Ansoff Matrix (also known as the product/market growth matrix)
  - Market development
  - Market penetration
  - Product development
  - Diversification (marketing strategy)
- Growth platforms
- Growth planning
- Horizontal integration
- Innovation
- Inorganic growth
  - Mergers and acquisitions
- Organic growth
- Profit impact on marketing strategy
- Vertical integration

=== Marketing warfare strategies ===
- Defensive strategy (marketing)
- Guerrilla marketing warfare strategies
  - Guerrilla marketing (also known as Attack marketing)

=== Implementation and control ===
Implementations and control are important features of the planning process. From time to time, marketers will use appropriate measures of performance to gauge whether plans are achieving the desired results. If necessary, corrective action can be taken to get back on track.

== Orientations ==
Marketing orientations are the philosophies or mindsets that guide and shape marketing planning and marketing practice. Some marketing historians believe that different philosophies have informed marketing practice at different times in marketing's history. Although there is no real agreement amongst scholars about the precise nature or number of distinct marketing orientations, the most commonly cited include:

- Marketing orientation (See section: Marketing orientation)
  - Marketing concept
- Production orientation (Also see: Production orientation or Production orientation)
- Market-orientated, also known as the Selling orientation (also see sections: Selling orientation or Sales orientation)
- Societal marketing (also see section: Societal marketing)
  - Sustainable market orientation
  - Corporate social responsibility
- Relationship orientation (also see Relationship orientation section)
  - Customer relationship management

== Management framework ==
Marketing planning or the process of developing a marketing program requires a detailed understanding of the marketing framework including consumer behavior, market segmentation, and marketing research. In the process of understanding the consumer market to be served, marketers may need to consider such issues as:

=== Consumer basics ===
- Brand awareness
- Consumer
- Consumerism
- Consumer socialization
- Consumer switching
- Customer engagement
- Customer knowledge
- Demographics
- Demographic profile
- Ethical consumerism
- Lifestyle
- Consumer purchase funnel

=== Consumer decision-making ===
The main steps in the consumer's purchase decision process are: Need or problem recognition → Information search → Evaluation of alternatives → Product/Brand Choice → Post purchase evaluation. See the following pages for more information on consumer decision-making:

- AIDA (marketing)
- Brand awareness
- Choice modelling
- Consumer confusion
- Decoy effect
- Impulse purchases
- Prospect theory
- Window shopping

=== Influences ===
Consumers' purchase decisions are influenced by a range of internal and external factors including:

Internal influences

- Attitudes, beliefs, demographics, aspirational age, aspirational brand, culture, learning, motivation, opinion leaders, risk perception and loss aversion, needs, social class, values

External influences

- Culture, family, reference groups, subculture, peer group, pester power, time

=== Market and marketing research ===
Marketing research refers to research activities designed to understand the marketing environment, including competitors, the socio-cultural environment and the politico-legal operating environment. Market research specifically refers to research concerned with understanding the market, that is, consumers, and is designed to yield actionable customer insights.

==== Quantitative methods ====
- Experimental techniques
- Exploratory research
- Online panels
- Questionnaire construction
- Quantitative research
- Statistical survey
- Survey methodology

==== Qualitative methods ====
- Computer-assisted qualitative data analysis software
- Ethnographic research
- Focus group
- Neuromarketing
- Observational techniques
  - Eye tracking
  - Electroencephalograph
  - Functional magnetic resonance imaging

==== Tools and techniques ====
- Advertising research
  - Ad tracking
  - Measuring advertising effectiveness
  - Concept testing
- Awareness research
- Behavioral economics
- Competitive intelligence
- Content analysis
- Coolhunting
- Conjoint analysis
- Customer satisfaction research
- Delphi technique
- Forecasting
  - Predictive buying
- Futures research
- Marketing information systems
- Marketing intelligence
- Mixed method research
- Motivational research
- Nominal group technique
- Psychometrics
- Innovation game
- Service quality research

==== Scale/questionnaire design ====
- Questionnaire construction
- Scales
  - Likert scale
  - Semantic differential

==== Sampling ====
- Cluster sampling
- Multistage sampling
- Nonprobability sampling
- Simple random sampling
- Statistical surveys
- Stratified sampling
- Systematic sampling

=== Market segmentation and targeting ===
==== Market segmentation ====
- Market segment (article)
- Segmenting and positioning (article)
- Market segmentation (section) or Market segmentation or Market segmentation (section)
- Mass customization
- Mass marketing
- Market segment
- Microsegmention
- Microsegment
- Niche market
- Hypersegmentation or one-to-one marketing
- Precision marketing
- Sub-niche market

=== Specific segmenting approaches ===
==== Consumer markets ====
The main bases for segmenting consumer markets include:

- Demographics
- Geodemographic segmentation (also known as Geo-targeting or Geodemography)
- Intermarket segmentation (for segmenting international markets)
- Psychographics (psychometric segmentation; lifestyle and values segmentation) (article) (also see: Psychographic segmentation -article)
- Sagacity segmentation
  - List of abbreviations for frequently used consumer segments

==== Business or industrial markets ====
The main bases for segmenting business or industrial markets include:

- Industrial market segmentation
  - Firmographics
  - Industry classification

==== Market segment size ====
- Bass diffusion model
- Serviceable available market
- Total addressable market

==== Targeting ====
- Targeting
- Attitudinal targeting
- Behavioral targeting
- Demographic profile
- Demographic targeting
- Geo-targeting
- Niche market
- Targeted advertising
- Target audience
- Persona (user experience)
- Serviceable available market
- Total addressable market

=== Segmentation tools ===
To support market segmentation, analysis marketers may require access to databases with large sample sizes. A number of commercial companies provide such data which typically includes proprietary software designed to interrogate the data and backed by algorithms that support different types of segmentation approaches. These commercial databases are often country or region specifically. Popular geo-demographic segmentation databases include:

- Acorn (UK)
- Claritas Prizm (US)
- Experian (Europe, US)
- Mosaic (Asia-Pacific)

Popular psychometric tools include:

- Roy Morgan Research (Asia Pacific)
- VALS (US)
- Values Modes

=== Statistical techniques ===
- Neural networks
- CHAID (Chi-square Automatic Interaction Detector)
- Canonical Analysis
- Choice Modelling
- Cluster analysis
- Conjoint analysis
- Cross tab
- Discriminant analysis
- Factor analysis
- Intent scale translation
- K-means
- Latent Class Analysis
- Logit analysis
- Multi dimensional scaling
- Preference regression
- Random Forests
- Structural Equation Modeling

== Marketing mix ==
The marketing program, also known as the marketing mix or the "4 Ps" consists of the product, price, place and promotion.

=== Product ===
- Badge engineering
- Cannibalization (marketing)
- Euro Car Segment
- Market cannibalism
- Market segmentation index
- Positioning (marketing)
- Packaging and labeling
  - Food labelling regulations
  - Labelling
  - Country of origin
  - Reusable packaging
  - Seasonal packaging
  - Wine label
- Premium product segment
- Product lifecycle
- Product life-cycle theory
- Product lining
- Product line extension
- Product category volume
- Product churning
- Product differentiation
- Product life cycle management (article)
- Product life-cycle management (marketing) (article)
- Technology lifecycle
- Life cycle cost analysis
- Planned obsolescence
- Product line
- Product proliferation
- Whole product
- Product portfolio
  - B.C.G. Analysis
  - G.E. Multi Factoral analysis
- Contribution margin analysis
- Product bundling
- Utility

==== Development of new products ====
Innovation and new product development are an important part of a firm's long term growth strategy.

The steps in a basic new production development process are:

Idea generation (or Ideation) → Concept screening→ Concept testing → Business analysis → Product development → Market testing → Commercialization

It may also include a soft launch.

The NPD process can be applied to:

Products: new product development and design
Services: service innovation and service design
Environmental goods or services: eco-innovation, ecodesign and lean product development

A recent trend in NPD is the use of participatory design, also known as co-design or co-operative design, which involves stakeholders such as employees or consumers in the design process.

Sources of new product ideas include: research and development, consumers or users, distributors, suppliers or crowdsourcing.

==== Innovation types ====
- Blue Ocean Strategy
- Disruptive innovation

NPD represents a high risk activity. It requires substantial investment and a list of product failures suggests that the probability of failure is relatively high.

==== New product adoption and diffusion ====
In order to develop a superior understanding of how new products are adopted by the marketplace and the factors that influence adoption rates, marketers often turn to a number of models or theories of the adoption/diffusion process:

- Bass diffusion model
- Diffusion
- Diffusion of innovations
  - Early adopter
  - Hype cycle
- Technology acceptance model
- Technology adoption life cycle
- Technology life cycle
- Quality function deployment
- Crossing the Chasm

==== Legal protections ====
New product development, including the design of product features, manufacturing processes, packaging design, etc. involves creative work and therefore constitutes intellectual property. A number of different legal avenues are available to protect different types of intellectual property.

- Certification mark
- Copyright
  - List of copyright acts
- Logo
- Patent
- Service mark
  - Service mark symbol
- Trademark
  - Sound trademark
- Trade secret

=== Brand management ===
- Branding (Promotional)
- Branding
  - Aspirational brand
  - Celebrity branding
  - Co-branding
  - Employer branding
  - Green brands
  - Internet branding
  - Ingredient branding
  - Lifestyle brand
  - Nation branding
  - Symbol-intensive brand
  - White-label product
- Brand architecture
- Brand asset management
- Brand alliances
- Brand ambassador
- Brand aversion
- Brand awareness
- Brand community
- Brand equity
- Brand experience
- Brand extension (also known as brand stretching)
- Brand implementation
- Brand language
- Brand loyalty
- Brand naming
- Brand orientation
- Brand preference
- Brand relationship
- Brand strength analysis
- Brand tribalism
- Brand switching
- Challenger brand
- Corporate identity
- Corporate branding
- Cult brand
- Disruptor brand
- Generic brand
- Hallmarks
  - Silver hallmarks
- List of fictional brands
- List of renamed brands
- Product proliferation
- Marque
- Rebranding
- Self-brand
- Visual brand language

==== Branding strategies ====
- Private brand (also known as Private labels or Store brand
- Private Label Strategy
- Brand licensing
- Corporate branding
- Family branding
- Fighter brand (also known as a fighting brand)
- Individual branding
- National brand
- Umbrella brand

==== Brand protection ====
- Copyright
- Service mark
- Trademark
  - Genericized trademark

==== Packaging and labelling ====
- Mandatory labelling
- Sustainable packaging

== Price ==
- Algorithmic pricing
- Barter
- Choice Modelling
- Competitor indexing
- Break even analysis
- Markup
- Loyalty card
- Operating margin
- Price elasticity of demand
- Pricing objectives
- Price points
- Price ceiling
- Price controls
- Price fixing
- Price fixing cases
- Price floor
- Price gouging
- Price mechanism
- Price signal
- Price system
- Price umbrella
- Purchasing power
- Real prices and ideal prices
- Reservation price
- Resale price maintenance
- Shadow price
- Switching costs
- Target pricing
- Transfer pricing
- Pricing science
- Price override
- Unit price

=== Pricing strategies ===
- Value-based pricing
- Relationship-oriented pricing
- Cost-plus pricing
- Cost-plus pricing with elasticity considerations
  - Rate of return pricing
  - Pricing for profit maximization

=== Pricing tactics ===
- Base point pricing
- Cost the limit of price
- Bait pricing
- Break-even (economics)
- Congestion pricing
- Contingency pricing
- Clearance sale
- Discounts and allowances
- Drip pricing
- Dumping (pricing policy)
- Everyday low price
- Fire sale
- Geographic pricing
- High–low pricing
- Loss leader
- Parity pricing:
  - Export parity price
  - Import parity price
- Penetration pricing
- Premium pricing (also known as Price premium)
- Price wars
- Joint product pricing
- Psychological pricing
- Premium pricing
- Price discrimination
  - Dynamic pricing
  - Time-based pricing
    - Geographical pricing and price zoning
- Value pricing or Value-based purchasing
- Price skimming
- Odd price
- Sliding scale fees
- Two part tariff
- Variable pricing and real-time pricing
- Penetration pricing
- Variable pricing
- Willingness to pay
- Yield management

== Place ==
- Direct marketing
- Database marketing
- Direct Marketing Association
- Drop shipping
- Jobber (merchandising)
    - Fuel jobber
    - Rack Jobber
    - Jobbing house
- Logistics
  - Green logistics
  - Logistic engineering
  - Reverse logistics
- Marketing channel
  - Marketing channels
- Sales (also known as Personal selling)
  - Sales management (also known as Sales force management)
  - Sales effectiveness
  - Sales force management system
  - Sales techniques
  - Negotiation
  - Shill
  - Large Group Awareness Training (LGAT)
  - Salesman
- Supply chain
  - Supply chain management
- Wholesale
  - Wholesaler
- Value chain
- Value migration

The following methods are prohibited in most nations:

- Multi-level marketing
- Pyramid scheme

== Promotion ==
- Marketing communications (section)
- Advertising agency or marketing communications agency
- Cross-promotion
- Communication planning
- Co-promotion
- Internal marketing
- Influencer marketing
- Positioning
- Referral marketing
- Street marketing
  - Street team
- Unique selling proposition
- Viral marketing
- Word of mouth marketing

=== Promotional elements ===
==== Advertising ====
- Ad blocking
- Advertising management
- Advertising campaign
- Account planning
- Advertising media selection
- Advertising slogan
- Attention (advertising)
- Augmented reality advertising
- Commercial skipping
- Consumer-generated advertising
- Digital marketing
- Frequency (marketing)
- History of advertising
- Immersive advertising
- Infomercial
- In-game advertising
- Innovation
- Interactive advertising
- Native advertising
- Perceptual blindness
- Persona
- Shock advertising
- Storyboard
- Targeted advertising
- Target audience
- Television commercial
- Reach (advertising)
- View-through rate

==== Advertising models ====
- AIDA (marketing)
- AISDALSLove
- DAGMAR marketing
- Elaboration likelihood model (article)
- Elaboration likelihood model (section)

===== Advertising research =====
- Advertising research (Article with a media focus)
- Ad tracking
- AttentionTracking
- Copy testing
- Eye tracking

===== Advertising media =====
- Audience measurement
- Advertising board
- Advertising postcard
- Cinema
- Display stand
- Interactive media
- Internet
- Magazines
  - List of magazines by circulation
- Mass media
- Media planning
- New media
- Newspapers
  - Newspaper circulation
  - Lists of newspapers
- Nielsen Media Research
- Out-of-home advertising
  - Aerial advertising
  - Billboard (advertising)
    - Digital billboard
    - Human billboard
    - Mobile billboard
    - Neon message board
    - Sandwich board
  - Kiosk
    - Interactive kiosks
  - Transit media
    - Bus advertising
    - Driven media
    - Fleet media
    - Truckside advertisement
    - Wrap advertising
  - Signage
    - Electronic signage
    - Digital signage
  - Skywriting
- Product placement
- Radio
  - List of most-listened-to radio programs
  - Nielsen ratings
  - Nielsen Audio
- Retail media
- Social media marketing
- Streaming media
- Television
  - List of most watched television broadcasts
  - OzTAM
  - Q Score
  - Television ratings

===== Award-winning advertising campaigns =====
- Share a Coke
- Coca-Cola's Hillsong campaign
- Slip-Slop-Slap (Anti-Cancer Institute of Australia) Winner of the International Sulzberger Award, 2010

==== Internet ====
- Affiliate marketing
- Banner blindness
- Behavioral Targeting
- Mobile advertising
- Online advertising
- Performance-based advertising
- Search analytics
- Search engine optimization
- Social media marketing
- Referral marketing
- Revenue sharing
- Web analytics

Main types of internet promotion
E-mail spam, e-mail marketing, post-click marketing, website monetizing, search engine marketing (SEM), search engine optimization (SEO), display advertising, contextual advertising
Internet advertising methods
Ad filtering, ad serving, central ad server, pop-up ad, contextual advertising, web banner
Search engine marketing payment methods
Pay per click, click fraud, paid inclusion
Internet metrics
Click through rate (CTR), cost per action (CPA), cost per click (CPC), cost per impression (CPI), cost per mille (CPM), effective cost per mille (eCPM)

==== Advertainment ====
- Advergaming
- Branded content (also known as Branded entertainment)
- In-game advertising
- Product placement

==== Direct and digital marketing ====
- Direct response television
- Direct response media
- Digital marketing (also known as Digital promotion
- E-commerce
- Email production
- Telemarketing
- Specialty catalogs

==== Personal selling ====
- AIDA (marketing)
- DAGMAR marketing
- Field marketing
- Sales management
  - Sales effectiveness
- Sales process
- Smarketing
  - Lead generation
  - Presentation
  - Closing (sales)
- Customer relationship management
- Customer lifecycle management

==== Sales promotion ====
- Gimmick
- Merchandising
- Branding (Promotional)
- Promotional campaign
- Point of sale
- Point of sale display

==== Public relations ====
- Buzz marketing
  - Buzz monitoring
- Corporate image
- Corporate communications
  - Cause marketing
- Content marketing
- Doing a Ratner
- Event marketing
- Exhibitions
- Speechwriter
- Trade fairs
- Undercover marketing
- Viral marketing
- Word of mouth and buzz

==== Sponsorship ====
- Ambush marketing
- Community marketing

==== Communications planning ====
- Kelman's source characteristics

==== Measuring communications effects ====
- Audience response
- Frequency (marketing)#Effective frequency
- Mind share
- Reach (advertising)
- Share of voice
- Share of wallet

=== Extended marketing mix ===
The extended marketing mix is used in the marketing of services, ideas and customer experiences and typically refers to a model of 7 Ps and includes the original 4 Ps plus process, physical evidence and people. Some texts use a model of 8 Ps and include performance level (service quality) as an 8th P.

=== Process ===
- Customer experience management
- Service blueprint

=== Physical evidence ===
- Virtual customer environment
- Front of house
- Front office
- Service innovation
- Service design
- Servicescapes

=== People ===
- Customer
- Customer to customer
- Dramaturgical perspective
- Personnel
- Pink-collar worker
- Customer interface
- CEM integration
- CEM organization
- Role theory
- Scripts

=== Measuring marketing performance ===
Marketing activities are costly and represent an investment in a company or brand's long-term future. With the increased emphasis on accountability, marketers must consider how they measure marketing's performance and communicate that to stakeholders. Various types of metrics that are in widespread use may be classified as:

==== Performance measures ====
- Market share
  - Market share analysis
- Market value
- Market power
  - Marketing Effectiveness
- Return on marketing investment (ROMI)
- Share of wallet

==== Advertising effectiveness measures ====
- Measuring advertising effectiveness
- Share of voice

==== Measures of brand health ====
- Brand equity
- Brand valuation
- Return on Marketing Investment (ROMI)

==== Customer-oriented measures ====
- Customer satisfaction
  - Customer satisfaction research
  - Customer data management
- Customer analytics

== Special topics ==
- Consumer Culture Theory (CCT)
- Customer privacy
- Consumer behavior and ideals of beauty
- Diversity marketing
- Remarketing with Iranian Style
- Family in advertising
- Effects of advertising on teen body image
- Marketing paradigms
- Marketing myopia
- Network marketing
- Postmodern marketing
- Sex in advertising
- Subliminal advertising
- Subvertising

== Branches ==
The Marketing Book, 7th ed., Routledge, Oxon, UK, 2016 edited by Michael J. Baker and Susan Hart identifies the distinct branches of marketing practice as:

- Business marketing, also known as business-to-business marketing and industrial marketing (which also includes business-to-government marketing)
- Consumer marketing (general marketing)
- Environmental marketing, also known as green marketing
- International marketing, also known as global marketing
- Relationship marketing
- Retailing
- Services marketing, which includes not-for-profit marketing and destination marketing
- Social marketing, which includes cause-related marketing
- Rental
- Auction
- Bidding

For special applications of marketing including marketing of specific types of products (e.g. agricultural marketing, faith based marketing, pharmaceutical marketing, political marketing, sports marketing, etc.,) or marketing to specific target groups (e.g. marketing to children, marketing to older people, LBGT marketing) see: special applications of marketing practice.

=== Business marketing ===
- Affiliate marketing
- Affinity marketing
- Co-marketing
- Firmographics
- Managed services
- Outsourcing
- Personal selling
- Prospecting
- Solution selling
- Sales
- Supply chain management
- Vendor lock-in

=== Environmental marketing ===
- Green marketing

=== International marketing ===
- Intermarket segmentation
- Global marketing
- Market entry strategies
- Product adaptation

=== Relationship marketing ===
- Customer relationship management
- ECRM - Electronic customer relationship management
- Customer lifetime value
  - Customer lifetime valuation
- Customer lifecycle management
- Loyalty marketing
  - Customer loyalty programs
  - Incentive program
  - Loyalty program
- Trust-based marketing

=== Services marketing ===
- Customer service
- Customer Service System
- Destination marketing
- Self-service
- Service quality
- SERVQUAL
- Customer satisfaction
- Customer satisfaction research
- Disconfirmed expectancy
- Quality management
- Servicescapes
- Service
- Service blueprint
- Quality
- Service quality (aka PZB model or gaps model)
- Experience economy
- Service design
- Service-dominant logic
- Service innovation
- Service mark
- Servicescapes
- Service sector
- Service recovery
- Service system
- Service recovery paradox
- Sports marketing
- Strategic service management

=== Social marketing ===
- Corporate social responsibility
- Cause-related marketing
  - Cause-related loyalty marketing
- Cradle to grave sustainability practices
- Green marketing
- Green brands
- Socially responsible marketing
- Societal marketing
- Sustainability marketing
- Sustainability brand
- Sustainable packaging
- Sustainability metrics and indices

=== Retailing ===
- E-tailing
- Point of sales
- Retail concentration
- Retail design
- Retail software
- Retail media
- Site selection
- Shopper marketing
- Store manager
- Visual merchandising

=== Types of retailer ===
- Arabber
- Bazaari
- Costermonger
- Hawker (trade)
- Huckster
- Merchant
- Peddler
- Street vendor

=== Retail outlets ===
- Arcade
- Automated retail
- Bazaar
  - Bedesten
  - Haat bazaar
  - Meena Bazaar
  - Landa bazaar
  - Saddar Bazaar
- Big-box store
- Category killer
- Chain store
- Charity shop
- Convenience store
- Department store
  - List of department stores
- Discount store
- Dollar store
- Hypermarket
- Franchising
- Market town
- Market
  - Wet market
  - Pasar malam
  - Pasar pagi
- Pawnbroker
- Pop-up retail
- Retailers' cooperative
- Shopping mall
- Shopping streets
- Second-hand shop
- Self-service
- Supermarket
  - List of supermarkets
- Strip mall
- Souq (or souk is an Arabic term for bazaar or market)
- Variety store
- Vending machine
- Warehouse club
- Warehouse store

== Special applications ==
- Advertising and marketing to children
- Adolescents and food marketing
- Agricultural marketing
- Agricultural value chain
- Alcohol advertising
- Business-to-government marketing
- Cause marketing
- City marketing
- Cosmetics advertising
- Community marketing
- Destination marketing
  - Destination marketing organization
- Evangelism marketing
- Engagement marketing
- Faith-based marketing
- Fish marketing
- Fast food advertising
- Food marketing
- Grey market
- Local store or neighbourhood marketing
- Megamarketing
- Marketing of Halo 3
- Movement marketing
- Pharmaceutical marketing
- Political advertising campaign
- Shrimp marketing
- Sports marketing
- Tobacco advertising
- Tourist attractions
- Wholesale marketing of food

== History ==
=== History of marketing ===
- History of advertising
- History of advertising
- History of advertising in Britain
- History of branding
- History of brand management
- History of marketing research
- History of market segmentation
- History of promotional merchandise
- History of retail
- History of merchants
- History of the market place
- Origins of the positioning concept
- Origins of consumer behaviour

=== Influential thinkers ===
- Wroe Alderson (1898–1965) – proponent of marketing science; instrumental in developing the functional school of marketing and in the managerial approach to marketing
- Igor Ansoff (1918–2002) – marketing/management strategist; noted for the product/market growth matrix
- David Aaker - highly awarded educator and author in the area of marketing and organisational theory
- N.W. Ayer – probably the first advertiser to use mass media (i.e. telegraph) in a promotional campaign and early proponent of media scheduling
- Leonard Berry (professor) (1942- ) – author and educator with strong interest in health marketing and relationship marketing
- Neil H. Borden (1922–1962) – coined the term 'marketing mix'; former President of the American Marketing Association
- Clayton Christensen – educator, author and consultant, published in the areas of innovation and entrepreneurship
- George S. Day – author and educator; has published in the area of strategic marketing
- Ernest Dichter (1907–1991) – market researcher, consumer behaviourist, pioneer of motivational research methods
- Andrew S. C. Ehrenberg (1926–2010) – made contributions to the methodology of data collection, analysis and presentation, and an understanding buyer behaviour and how advertising works
- Edward Filene (1860–1937) – an early pioneer of modern retailing methods
- Seth Godin – popular author, entrepreneur, public speaker and marketer
- Paul E. Green (1927–2012) – academic and author; the founder of conjoint analysis and popularised the use of multidimensional scaling, clustering, and analysis of qualitative data in marketing.
- Shelby D. Hunt (1939- ) – former editor of the Journal of Marketing and organisational theorist noted for his contributions to RA theory
- John E. Jeuck (1916–2009) – early marketing educator
- Philip Kotler (1931- ) – popularised the managerial approach to marketing; prolific author
- E. St. Elmo Lewis (1872–1948) – developed the AIDA model used in sales and advertising
- Christopher Lovelock (1940–2008) – author of many books and articles on services marketing
- Theodore Levitt (1925–2006) – former editor of Harvard Business Review, prolific author of marketing articles and famed for his article, "Marketing Myopia"
- E. Jerome McCarthy – popularised the managerial approach to marketing; developed the concept of the 4Ps (i.e. the 'marketing mix' or marketing program)
- Arthur Nielsen (1897–1980) – early market researcher; pioneered methods for estimating radio and TV audiences and ratings
- David Ogilvy (1911–1999) – advertising guru, early pioneer of the market positioning concept
- Vance Packard – journalist and author, wrote The Hidden Persuaders (1957) which explored the use of motivational research in marketing practice
- Charles Coolidge Parlin (1872–1942) – pioneer of market and advertising research methods
- Rosser Reeves (1910–1984) – advertising guru; advocate of frequency in media schedules
- Al Ries – advertising executive, author and credited with coining the term, 'positioning' in the late 1960s
- Arch Wilkinson Shaw (1876–1962) – early management theorist, proponent of the scientific approach to marketing
- Henry Charles Taylor (1873–1969) – the agricultural marketer
- Richard S. Tedlow – author and educator; published in the area of marketing history
- James Walter Thompson (1847–1928) – founded one of the earliest modern advertising agencies, J Walter Thompson; a very early proponent of using brand image in advertising
- Jack Trout – together with Al Ries, popularised the positioning concept
- Don E. Schultz – father of 'integrated marketing communications' (IMC)
- Stephen Vargo– together with R.F. Lusch developed the Service-dominant logic approach to marketing
- Henry Grady Weaver (1889–1949) – developed the survey questionnaire for use in market research
- Jerry (Yoram) Wind – former editor of the Journal of Marketing, educator and marketer
- Byron Sharp – N.Z. academic; one of the first to document buyer loyalty in empirical work
- Daniel Starch (1883–1979) – psychologist and marketing researcher, developed the so-called Starch scores to measure impact of magazine advertising; Starch scores are still in use
- Gerald Zaltman – developed the Metaphor Elicitation Technique (ZMET)
- Valarie Zeithaml – together with A. Parasurman and L.L. Berry, developed the model of service quality and the SERVQUAL research instrument

== Trade magazines and academic journals ==
- Ad Age
- Adweek
- Brandweek
- International Journal of Bank Marketing
- Journal of Personal Selling & Sales Management
- Inside Retail (Australia)
- International Journal of Research in Marketing
- Journal of Creative Communications
- Journal of Consumer Research
- Journal of Marketing Research
- Journal of Marketing
- Journal of Marketing Education
- Journal of Service Research
- Journal of Vacation Marketing
- Marketing
- Marketing (United Kingdom)
- Marketing Science
- Marketing Theory
- Marketing Week
- The Marketer United Kingdom (defunct)
- Mediaweek
- PRWeek United Kingdom
- Sales Promotion
- Social Marketing Quarterly
- Sponsor

== Association and societies ==
- American Marketing Association
- Association of National Advertisers
- Australian Market and Social Research Society Limited
- Canadian Marketing Association
- Construction Marketing Association
- Direct marketing association
- Direct Marketing Association (UK)
- Direct Marketing Association (USA)
- Direct Marketing Association (South Africa)
- Direct Selling Association
- European Marketing Research Centre
- Marketing Research Association
- Market Research Society
- Potato Marketing Corporation of Western Australia
- Produce Marketing Association
- Promotion Marketing Association

== Archives, museums and galleries ==
- American Advertising Museum
- Museum of Brands, Packaging & Advertising, Notting Hill, London
- Musée de la Publicité
- The Advertising Archives
- William F. Eisner Museum of Advertising & Design, Milwaukee, Wisconsin

== Lists and outlines ==
- Outline of business management
- Outline of economics
- Outline of commercial law
- Outline of production
- List of abbreviations for market segments
- List of department stores
- List of influential advertising theorists
- List of influential salesmen and sales theorists
- List of accounting topics
- List of international trade topics
- List of business law topics
- List of business theorists
- List of economists
- List of most-listened-to radio programs
- List of most watched television broadcasts
- List of magazines by circulation
- List of marketing and advertising authors
- Lists of newspapers
- List of supermarkets

== Marketing education ==
- History of marketing thought and education
- Escola Superior de Propaganda e Marketing, Brazil (School of Advertising & Marketing)
- Master of Business Administration
- Master of Marketing Research
- Bachelor of Business
- Bachelor of Business Administration
- Bachelor of Pharmaceutical Marketing and Management Philadelphia College of Pharmacy and Science
