= List of acronyms: 0–9 =

This list contains acronyms, initialisms, and pseudo-blends .

For the purposes of this list:

- acronym = an abbreviation pronounced as if it were a word, e.g., SARS = severe acute respiratory syndrome, pronounced to rhyme with cars
- initialism = an abbreviation pronounced wholly or partly using the names of its constituent letters, e.g., CD = compact disc, pronounced cee dee
- pseudo-blend = an abbreviation whose extra or omitted letters mean that it cannot stand as a true acronym, initialism, or portmanteau (a word formed by combining two or more words).

(a) = acronym, e.g.: SARS – (a) severe acute respiratory syndrome
(i) = initialism, e.g.: CD – (i) compact disc
(p) = pseudo-blend, e.g.: UNIFEM – (p) United Nations Development Fund for Women
(s) = symbol (none of the above, representing and pronounced as something else; for example: MHz – megahertz)

Some terms are spoken as either acronym or initialism, e.g., VoIP, pronounced both as voyp and V-O-I-P.

== 0–9 ==
- 0D – Zero-dimensional
- 1, – Onekama, Michigan (word play based on "one, comma")
- 1AM – Air mechanic 1st class
- 1D – One-dimensional
- 2AM – Air mechanic 2nd class
- 2D – (i) Two-dimensional
- 2.5D – (p) "Two-and-a-half-dee": two-dimensional computer graphics where some flat images lie in front of others
- 2G – (i) Second-generation mobile (cellular, wireless) telephone system
- 2.5G – (p) Second-and-a-half-generation mobile telephone system
- 2LA – Two letter acronym
- 2Lt – 2nd lieutenant
- 3AM – Air mechanic 3rd class
- 3D – (i) Three-dimensional
- 3G – (i) Third-generation mobile telephone system
- 3i – (i) Investors In industry (venture capitalists)
- 3M – (i) Minnesota Mining and Manufacturing Company
- 4D – (i) Four-dimensional (usually three spatial plus one temporal dimension, sometimes four spatial ones)
- 4G – (i) Fourth-generation mobile telephone system
- 4GL – (i) Fourth-generation programming language
- 4WD – (i) Four-wheel drive
- 5D – Five-dimensional
- 5G – fifth generation mobile telephone system
- 6D – Six-dimensional
- 7D – Seven-dimensional
- 8D – Eight-dimensional
- 9D – Nine-dimensional

== See also ==
- Backronym
- Jargon
- List of reporting marks
- List of government and military acronyms
- List of information technology acronyms
- List of medical abbreviations
- List of abbreviations in photography
- List of abbreviations for market segments
- List of Hebrew acronyms
- List of U.S. government and military acronyms
- List of geographic acronyms and initialisms
- Wikipedia:List of all single-digit-single-letter combinations
- Wikipedia:List of all single-letter-single-digit combinations
- Wikipedia:List of all single-letter-double-digit combinations
- Wikipedia:TLAs
