= Parity price =

Parity price may refer to:

- Export parity price
- Import parity price

== See also ==
- Doctrine of parity
