= Field marketing =

Type of direct marketing

Field marketing is a method of direct marketing that involves people distributing, auditing, selling or sampling promotions in the "field".

Field marketing is historically thought of as a one-way communication tool. The brand's message is delivered from promotional personnel to the consumer whether through the medium of a sample, a piece of merchandise, or literature.

In current times, field marketing may also include two-way communications such as requesting feedback about a sample or inviting consumers to follow a brand on social media.

Field marketing can be differentiated from all other direct marketing activities because it is face-to-face personal contact direct marketing. Field marketing includes highly targeted direct selling promotions, merchandising, auditing, sampling and demonstration, experiential marketing, organizing roadshows, events, and mystery shopping. These disciplines, individually or combined, develop brands and in their implementation show a clear return on investment (ROI) to the brand owner. This is a key feature and benefit of field marketing – seeing revenue expenditure generate a specific return.

Field marketing professionals are able to give support to marketing operations. This includes counteracting a competitor's campaign and/or increasing market distribution. Individuals in this profession are preferred to have extensive knowledge of different industries. Personnel are experienced, trained, and supported by computer reporting systems. This allows for a high degree of accuracy and high-speed reporting and compilation of data that allows fast and flexible solutions to the dynamics of the changing environment tailored to the needs of the client's market. Each marketing campaign might involve two or more core disciplines to maximize client budgets and give as much payback as possible.

== See also ==
- Advertising
- Co-marketing
- List of marketing terms
- Marketing
- Marketing management
- Outline of marketing
- Real-time marketing
- Smarketing
- Direct marketing
