= Margo Buchanan-Oliver =

New Zealand economist

- Born: 20 March 1952
- Died: 25 April 2018 (aged 66)
- Education: University of Auckland
- Scientific career
- Workplaces: University of Auckland
- Thesis: Media vitae in morte sumus : patterns of life and death in the English mediaeval morality drama : with special reference to the play Mankind (1989)

Margo Buchanan-Oliver (20 March 1952 – 25 April 2018) was a full professor in the Faculty of Business and Economics at the University of Auckland in New Zealand.

== Academic career ==
Buchanan-Oliver completed a PhD at the University of Auckland in 1989 with a thesis titled Media vitae in morte sumus: patterns of life and death in the English mediaeval morality drama: with special reference to the play Mankin. She rose to full professor and head of the Department of Marketing in the Faculty of Business and Economics at the University of Auckland.

== Selected works ==
- Davis, Robert, Margo Buchanan-Oliver, and Roderick J. Brodie. "Retail service branding in electronic-commerce environments." Journal of Service Research 3, no. 2 (2000): 178–186.
- Lindgreen, Adam, Robert Davis, Roderick J. Brodie, and Margo Buchanan-Oliver. "Pluralism in contemporary marketing practices." International Journal of Bank Marketing 18, no. 6 (2000): 294–308.
- Colgate, Mark, Margo Buchanan-Oliver, and Ross Elmsly. "Relationship benefits in an internet environment." Managing Service Quality: An International Journal 15, no. 5 (2005): 426–436.
- Davis, Robert, Margo Buchanan-Oliver, and Roderick Brodie. "Relationship marketing in electronic commerce environments." Journal of Information Technology 14, no. 4 (1999): 319–331.
- Bulmer, Sandy, and Margo Buchanan‐Oliver. "Visual rhetoric and global advertising imagery." Journal of Marketing Communications 12, no. 1 (2006): 49–61.
