= SMQ =

SMQ may refer to:

- IATA code for H. Asan Airport, Sampit Airport
- FAA LID code for Somerset Airport (New Jersey)
- Social Marketing Quarterly
- Standardized MedDRA Query
