= Strawberry Frog =

Strawberry Frog may refer to:

- Strawberry poison-dart frog, (Dendrobates pumilio), a poison dart frog found in Central America
- Strawberry Rain Frog (Breviceps acutirostris), a frog endemic to South Africa
- StrawberryFrog, an independent advertising agency; see Movement marketing
