= Crunchbase =

Online database of companies and start-ups

- Website type: Data as a service
- Available in: English
- Headquarters: San Francisco, California
- Owners: TechCrunch (2007–2015); Crunchbase, Inc. (2015–present)
- Creator: Michael Arrington
- Employees: 245 (2026)
- Website: www.crunchbase.com
- Commercial: Yes
- Registration: Optional
- Launched: May 17, 2007; 19 years ago
- Current status: Online

Crunchbase is a database providing information on private and public companies. Its content is compiled through a combination of live company data, artificial intelligence, and contributions from a community of over 80 million users.

== History ==
Crunchbase's logo prior to rebranding from CrunchBase to Crunchbase

Founded in 2007 by Michael Arrington, Crunchbase was established as a supplementary database to track various startups featured in articles on TechCrunch. In September 2010, the platform was acquired by AOL as part of its broader acquisition of the TechCrunch network.

In November 2013, AOL entered into a dispute with startup Pro Populi over the company's use of the entire Crunchbase dataset in apps developed by Pro Populi, despite having distributed the data under the Creative Commons CC-BY attribution license. Pro Populi was represented by the Electronic Frontier Foundation. AOL eventually conceded that Pro Populi could continue to use the dataset, but adopted the CC BY-NC license for future revisions. A snapshot of the 2013 dataset is still available for download under the CC-BY license on the Crunchbase website.

In 2014, Crunchbase added incubators and venture capital partners to the startup database. In 2015, Crunchbase went private, separating from AOL, Verizon, and TechCrunch, after announcing it raised $8.5 million in investment funding. In 2016, the company rebranded from CrunchBase to Crunchbase and launched its first product, Crunchbase Pro. In April 2017, Crunchbase announced an $18 million Series B from Mayfield Fund. At the same time, Crunchbase launched two new products: Crunchbase Enterprise and Crunchbase for Applications.

In 2018, Crunchbase launched Crunchbase Marketplace, providing subscriptions to data from third parties. The following year, Crunchbase announced a $30 million Series C led by Omers Ventures.

Over time, Crunchbase expanded its role in several phases: initially serving as a data resource for investors, later licensing its dataset to professional platforms (such as LinkedIn, Glassdoor, and NASDAQ), and eventually creating integrations with workflow tools including Salesforce, HubSpot, and Outreach. These partnerships and integrations fueled steady growth, with the platform's user base surpassing 80 million by the mid-2020s.

In 2025, Crunchbase partnered with Perplexity, making Crunchbase's firmographic and funding data available within Perplexity Enterprise Pro. Crunchbase also partnered with Databricks, making its predictive private company intelligence available through the Databricks Marketplace.

On January 28, 2026, Crunchbase was a victim of a cyberattack allegedly carried out by the group ShinyHunters, which claims to have stolen more than 2 million records containing personal data.

== Products ==
Crunchbase's core offerings include:

- Crunchbase Pro, a paid subscription service that offers advanced search filters, analysis tools, and alerts for monitoring private companies.
- Crunchbase Business, which provides additional team-oriented features including data export capabilities, CRM integration, and API access
- Crunchbase API.
- Data enrichment to give tools access to Crunchbase's proprietary data and predictions.
- Data licensing to share Crunchbase's proprietary data and predictions.
