= Customer satisfaction research =

Customer satisfaction research is that area of marketing research, customer intelligence, and customer analytics which focuses on customers' perceptions with their shopping or purchase experience.

Companies are interested in understanding what their customers think about their shopping or purchase experience, because finding new customers is generally more costly and difficult than servicing existing or repeat customers.

== Types of research ==
=== Descriptive or documentary research ===
Many customer satisfaction studies are intentionally or unintentionally only descriptive in nature because they give a snapshot in time of customer attitudes. If the study instrument is administered to groups of customers periodically, then a descriptive picture of customer satisfaction through time can be developed ("tracking" or cohort study).

=== Inferential or models-based research ===
Beyond documentary types of work are studies that attempt to provide an understanding of why customers have the perceptions they do and what may be done to change those perceptions. While models-based studies also provide snapshots of customer attitudes, the results of these studies are more powerful because they present the firm with recommendations on how to improve customer satisfaction. Frequently, these studies also provide firms with a prioritization of the various recommended actions. Inferential studies can also be conducted as tracking studies. When this is done, the firm can gain insight into how the drivers of customer satisfaction are changing in addition to documenting the levels and areas of customer satisfaction.

== Methods ==
Both quantitative studies and qualitative studies are critical to understanding customer satisfaction.

=== Quantitative research studies ===
Quantitative studies allow a firm to develop an understanding of the "big picture" of their customers' experiences based upon a relatively small number of interviews. This sample of the firm's customers must be carefully designed and drawn if the results of the study are to be considered representative of the customer population as a whole. In most cases, the results of quantitative studies are based upon the responses of a relatively large number of interviews. Depending upon the size of the population and the amount of segmentation desired, "large" can be as few as 50 responses or range from several hundred to thousands of interviews. Mail-based, telephone-based, and (more recently) Internet-based surveys and related customer data collection.

=== Qualitative research studies ===
Qualitative studies are used by firms to provide a more detailed and/or unconstrained understanding of customer experiences. In most cases, the results of qualitative studies are based upon dozens of interviews. Qualitative studies are not designed to provide insights that are projectable to the customer population: qualitative studies are used for initial exploration of experiences and topics or to probe more deeply the reasons behind customer perceptions. Focus groups (group depth interviews) and "one-on-ones" (individual depth interviews) are the common examples of qualitative studies.

== See also ==
- Customer satisfaction
- Quantitative marketing research
- Qualitative research
- Online panel
- Service quality
- SERVQUAL
