= Share of wallet =

Survey method used in performance management

Share of wallet (SOW) is a survey method used in performance management that helps managers understand the amount of business a company gets from specific customers.

Another common definition is the following: Share of wallet is the percentage ("share") of a customer's expenses ("of wallet") for a product that goes to the firm selling the product. Different firms fight over the share they have of a customer's wallet, all trying to get as much as possible. Typically, these different firms don't sell the same but rather ancillary or complementary product.

== Application ==
Share of wallet is commonly used in B2B context, and in the finance, banking and retail sectors, to describe share-of-customer. Increasing share-of-customer is a key consideration increasing customer lifetime value. The reason is that retaining and growing customers is cheaper than acquiring new customers.

Forte Consultancy says: "The percentage of a customer's spend that is with a given company over a given amount of time. For a gas retailer, for example, it's the number of times a given customer fills up their car's gas tank one month at their own pumps divided by the total number of times the same customer fills up their car's gas tank that entire month. So a customer who fills up his or her car's gas tank four times a month with three of those fills at one gas retailer is giving that gas retailer 75% share of their wallet."

Under a share-of-wallet contract in a B2B context, contract terms are "designed to induce and reward customer loyalty by offering discounts when a customer contracts and commits to buying more than a threshold share in [a] category from the supplier".

== Research ==
Share of wallet and customer's loyalty and satisfaction are positively correlated. As a result, marketers in recent years have spent more resources on developing loyalty programs. Some researchers have argued that customer's satisfaction is not a strong enough predictor for share of wallet, and that marketers should focus on how a specific brand ranks in users' minds relatively to other brands in the category. This means that using net promoter score is not useful by itself when marketers are looking to increase share of wallet, as it does not look at the category as a whole.

Previous research has also found that higher switching costs of loyalty programs leads to higher share of wallet – regardless of customer satisfaction. A common way to increase share of wallet for retailers is to use personalisation, and to offer shoppers discounts for related categories or products that could be relevant to them in order to increase their overall share of wallet. A Mckinsey report found using personalisation drives loyalty and share of wallet by 1–2% for retailers as well as decreasing marketing and sales costs by 10–20%.

== See also ==
- Churn rate
- Customer acquisition cost
