= Firmographics =

Sets of characteristics to segment companies and other organizations

- Field: Business-to-business marketing; Market segmentation
- Origin: Industrial market segmentation literature of the 1970s–1980s
- Key people: J. Frederick; P. M. Banting; Yoram Wind; Richard Cardozo; Thomas Bonoma; Benson Shapiro
- Purpose: Segmentation of organizations using structural and performance characteristics analogous to demographics for individuals

Firmographics (also known as emporographics or firm demographics) are sets of characteristics to segment prospect organizations.

What demographics are to people, firmographics are to organizations. However, Webster (2005) suggested that the term "firmographics" is a combination of demographics and geographics.

Commonly used firmographics include SIC, company size and location. The term "firmographics" is mostly used in relation to a first step of nested approach or segmentation funnel, which was introduced by Shapiro and Bonoma in 1984.

== Goals and purposes ==
Firmographics variables allow firms to consider the features of organizational behavior in detail, for instance in a particular industry. It is helpful when there is no significant difference between operating variables, purchasing approach, situational factors and personal characteristics of customers.

Geodemographic segmentation is a logical starting point because

1. The data are obtainable through secondary sources, government agencies, or demographic vendors;
2. It provides a quick snapshot of a market—an understanding of market structure and potential customer segments; and
3. Target populations can be sampled to represent characteristics of the entire market at a much lower cost than other forms of business segmentation.

However, Webster (2005) believed that this approach misses a set of essential variables. Moreover, a differentiation between segmentation bases of nested approach is too complicated.

== Historical development ==
The first attempts to segment industrial markets were made in 1934. J. Frederick described five factors that should be considered when defining a component market: industry, product use, company buying habits, channels of distribution, and geographic location.

The term emporographics was coined by Banting in the early 1970s and refers to the equivalent of demographics in the context of industrial markets (Gross, A.C., Banting, P.M., Meredith, L.N., and Ford, I.D.: Business Marketing. Houghton Mifflin, Boston, MA, 1993). However, now the term "firmographics" is increasingly widely used.

Yoram Wind and Richard Cardozo in 1974 advocate a two-stage approach to industrial segmentation that consists of macrosegments and microsegments. They explain that macrosegments consist of key organizational characteristics such as size of the buying firm, SIC category, geographic location, and usage factors, hence, mostly of firm demographics. In some cases, single-stage segmentation based primarily on business demographics is sufficient for identifying and targeting markets. More typical, however, is that a two-stage approach that will employ benefits and organizational psychographics and purchasing criteria will be needed to provide complete market profiles.

Firmographics play crucial role in one of the most significant developments in business segmentation theory came in 1984 with the work of Bonoma and Shapiro who were the first to propose a truly multistep basis for segmenting business markets. They proposed the use of five general segmentation criteria which they arranged in a nested hierarchy. The set of segmentation bases captures from macro-level to micro-level, and firmographics belong to the macro approach and comprise from industry, company size, customer location.

== Benefits and pitfalls ==
It is not recommended to base segmentation solely on emporographics in the long term unless they reflect clear differences in needs, benefits, and product use. This is because the increasing competitive pressures observable in most organizational markets will, sooner or later, erode any industry structures not based on customer needs.

Firmographics may bear little direct relation to user needs or purchase requirements and benefits. Curran and Goodfellow suggest that descriptor-based approaches are popular, because they are convenient, clear cut, easy to implement, and they result in boundaries that are relatively stable over time.

Nevertheless, they add, such approaches are also arbitrary and usually are based largely on managerial judgment and intuition. It is easy for empirically oriented academics to underestimate the importance and value of managerial intuition, especially when this is based on experience. The attraction of descriptor-based or firmographic approaches is understandable in the circumstances and can provide useful and important insights to the practical issues of engaging with customers. More accurately, such emporographic variables facilitate such logistical issues of supplier convenience as minimizing sales or distribution costs and, perhaps, prices but this is not the principal reason for emporographic analysis.

But these approaches provide little understanding of underlying customer needs and so do not constitute a sufficient basis for segmentation in unfamiliar or competitively challenging markets. This point is demonstrated in product development processes where sophisticated segmentation will provide ample insight to evolving customer needs into the future, while emporographic approaches will struggle even to describe historic customer needs.

== Variables ==
=== Industry ===
Industry firmographics refer to the activities of the firm. At a very high level, organizations can be classified into business and government segments. Most business activities are naturally constrained to certain industries due to their core competencies or the demands of the customers. Only a few business activities are not. Therefore, industry type becomes a natural market segmentation variable for businesses. Government organizations can be segmented by their federal, state, county, regional, city, and municipality status. The dominant business segmentation variables are those associated with an NAICS or SIC code. NAICS refers to the North American Industry Classification System adapted by the U.S. Census bureau in 1997. SIC refers to the older Standard Industrial Classification system that was established in 1937. Either NAICS or SIC can be used to identify firms by industry. While most businesses use the newer NAICSS, many still work with the older SIC and both systems can be used with most modern business research reports and tools.

=== Location ===
Location firmographics refers to where the business is located. As a segmentation variable, firms may be aggregated by city, metropolitan statistical area, state, region, country, or continent. Alternatively, firms may be targeted according to their distance from a central location, usually the location of the firm conducting the sales and marketing effort. Most business activities are naturally constrained to certain regions due to competitive pressures, legal restrictions, and cost constraints. Only a few business activities are not. As such, location becomes a natural market segmentation variable for businesses. The nature of the industry plays a role if the location is of big importance. Businesses in a certain industry can therefore be compared with each other on location.

=== Customer size ===
Customer size in Firmographics refers to the size of clients the company has. This can range from small- to mid-size companies or Fortune 500 clients. (Korten, 2012) The size of customers companies aim for may distinguish one company from another. The basis for measuring the different size of customers is depending on which product or service is being purchased. For example, there are customers that purchase high volumes of low-priced products or customers that purchase low volumes of high-priced products.

=== Status and structure ===
Status and structure firmographics can refer to the relation of one organization to another, or it can refer to the legal status of an organization. For instance, individual establishments (also known as firms by the above definition) may be categorized as being independent businesses, part of a larger parent company, or the headquarters of a parent company. Similarly, firms may be categorized as being a stand-alone entity, a franchisee of a franchising organization, a subsidiary of a larger organization, or the outlet of a larger organization. Alternatively, firms may be categorized as being a sole proprietorship, limited liability corporation, limited liability partnership, private corporation, or public shareholder-owned corporation. Other variables describing the status or structure of an organization are used as well.

=== Performance ===
Performance firmographics refer to the characteristics of a firm related to its business execution over time. The duration of a firm's existence, rate of growth or decline, profits and losses, and changes in profits and losses can all be indicators of the likelihood of a firm to need a business product or service. Firms in the same industry of relatively similar size but undergoing different rates of growth or decline are likely to have very different demands for business services. As such, they can form meaningful segmentation variables. Companies carrying put segmentation of their customers choose performance metrics based on the information they would like to acquire. That is why there may be no performance variable, but a group of variables that can be referred to as «performance», such as:

1. Annual revenue: There's usually a clear correlation between how significant a company's annual earnings are, and whether a buyer would have money in the budget to afford doing business with a company.
2. Executive title: Which titles are proven most likely to need your products and/or services?
3. Average sales cycle: How long does the average sale take to close? What is the official dividing line between prospects who want to make a well-informed buying decision and those who have no real intention of buying.

The table below represents some other possible variables used in firmographics:

Variable
Data
Age
Years in Business
Size
- Number of Employees
- Number of Locations
- Number of Plants
Financial
- Sales
- Profits
- Credit Rating
Decisions
- Headquarter/Subsidiary
- Branch
Ownership
- Public Company
- Private Company
- Government
- Non-Profit
Market
- Market Size
- Number of Potential Customers
- Market Structure
Position
- Market Share
- Industry Position
Stage
- Product Life Cycle
- Industry Life Cycle
Trends
- Growth
- Decline
- Stability
Customers
- B2B
- B2C
- B2E
- B2G
Property
- Lease - Plant & Equipment
- Own - Plant & Equipment
Residency
Length of Residency
Manufacturing
- Discrete Manufacturing
- Process Manufacturing
Technology
- High Tech
- Low Tech

== See also ==
- Industrial market segmentation
- Industrial marketing
- Market segmentation
- Marketing
- Marketing research
- List of marketing topics
- Crunchbase
