= Defensive strategy (marketing) =

Marketing strategy to retain customers

Defensive strategy is defined as a marketing tool that helps companies to retain valuable customers that can be taken away by competitors. Competitors can be defined as other firms that are located in the same market category or sell similar products to the same segment of people. When this rivalry exist, each company must protect its brand, growth expectations, and profitability to maintain a competitive advantage and adequate reputation among other brands. To reduce the risk of financial loss, firms strive to take their competition away from the industry.

== Importance of defensive strategy ==
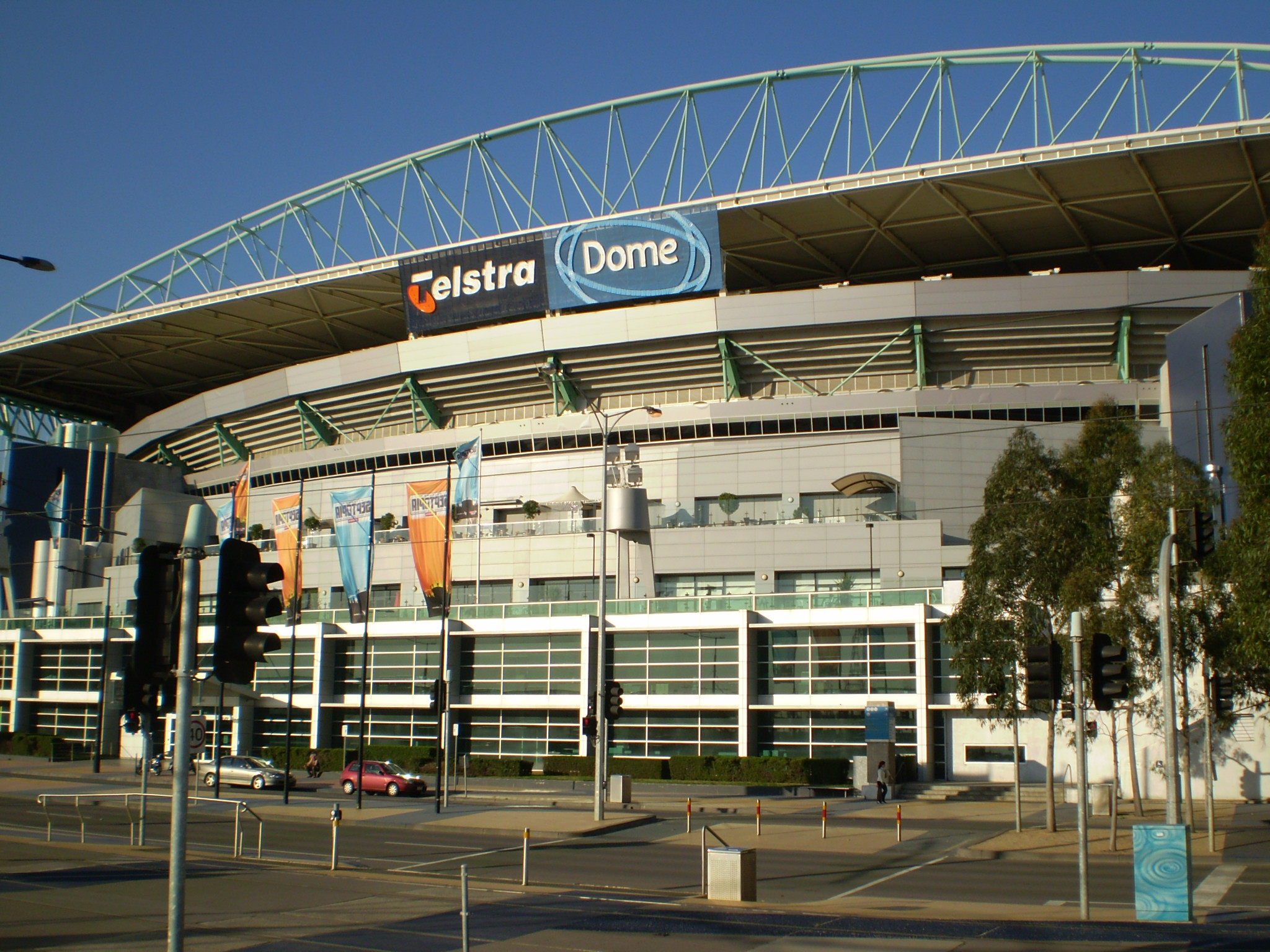
Telstra Dome in Docklands

Incumbents usually appear when a company is profitable or economically successful and other competitors fight against it to reach that position in the market. Customers are essential for a business growth but a company can't control their product and services preferences, so firms have to do the impossible to keep the satisfaction of customers at any cost. It is important to give the customers what they want and say what they want to hear.

For example, in the late 1990s the Australian telecommunication company Telstra was facing the fear of competition for the first time due to the facts that a new entrant called Optus was already threatening the company's operation. The managers of Telstra knew that they have to act quickly and decided to implement a defensive strategy. They created a model to predict consumers' responses and Telstra redesigned its internal operations leaving Optus in a vulnerable situation. The company enhanced its reputation and market share.

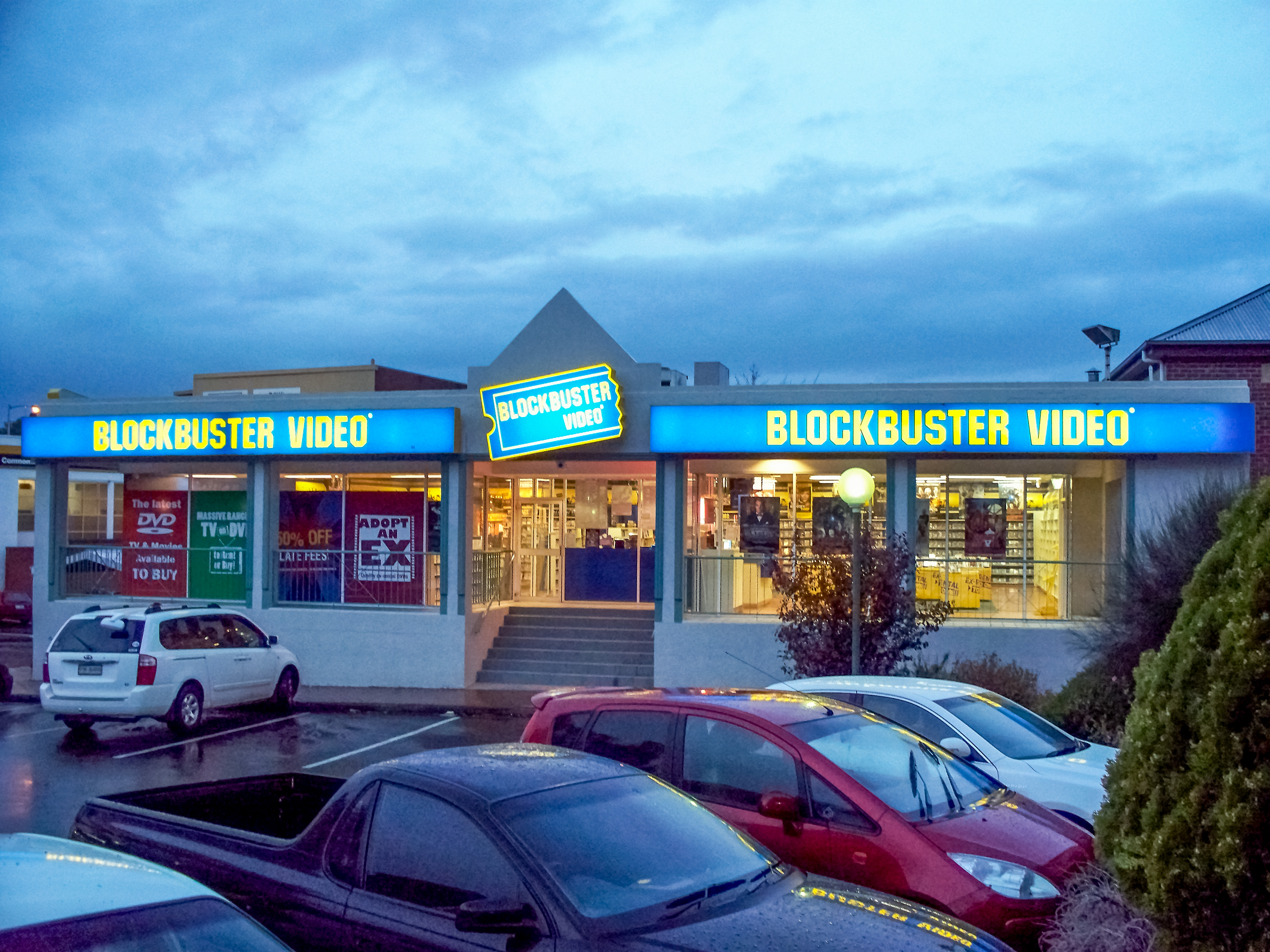
Blockbuster store in Australia

When technology is changing, companies tend to have more risk of losing potential customers with other firms. For example, Blockbuster was one of the biggest and most recognized DVD rental companies in the world. When Netflix appeared in the industry, Blockbuster had to take a defensive strategy to fight against that strong competitor. The company launched an online platform where people had to pay a little amount of money and watch movies online. This strategy was useful at first but Netflix offers were preferred by a lot of people in economic terms. Blockbuster went into bankruptcy and liquidated its stores because they were losing so much money.

There are two main assumptions of the defensive strategy:

1. Attacking the benefits, which means that companies have to seek the way of weaken the product of the competition.
2. Highlighting the risks, which means that company has to take into consideration the risk that could face and protect its brand.

== Elements ==
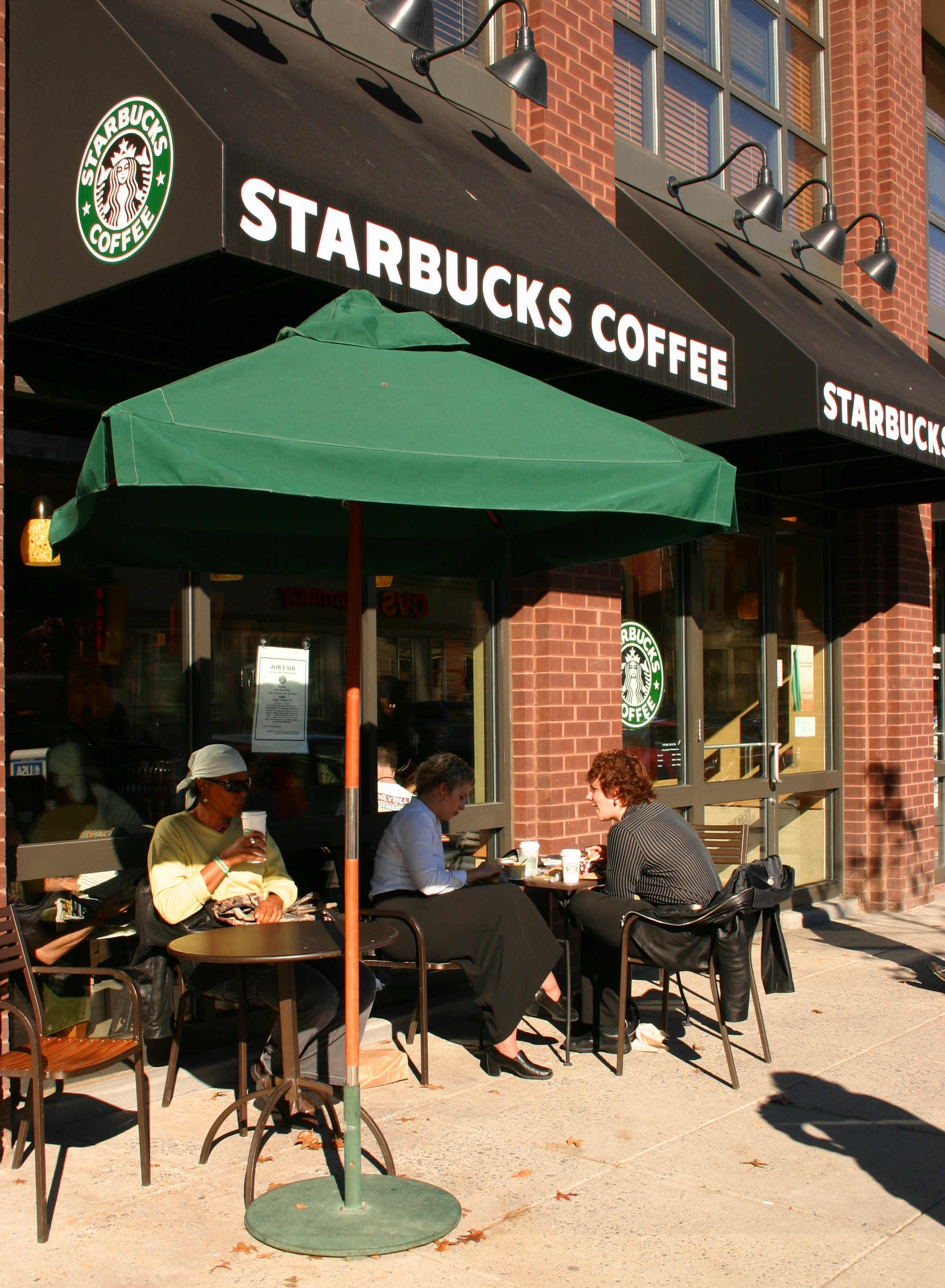
Starbucks shop in Washington DC

There are three strategies considered as essential elements of defensive strategy:

=== Retrenchment ===
A new defensive strategy requires planning. It consists of the reduction of the expenses by selling assets or having employees' layoffs to increase profitability. This forces employees to manufacture the company's products with limited resources or with cheaper raw material. For example, in years before 2009, Starbucks has had 600 closings in the United States and 61 in Australia. In 2009 the CEO of Starbucks, Howard Schultz, was planning on closing 300 company - operated stores around the world and 200 of them were established in the United States. After all that, the company planned to open 140 stores in the United States and 170 stores globally spread in the same year. To accomplish that, the firm wanted to cut 700 work positions around the world. Also, Starbucks was planning on entering to the value - meal race to compete with the McDonald's new McCafé coffee bars and survive the global recession.

Five guidelines indicate when a company should begin retrenchment should be implemented:

- The company has clear knowledge of their competence but has failed to focus and achieve their goals.
- The company is the weaker competitor in an industry or market place.
- An organization doesn't operate with efficiency, scarcity of employee motivation, low reliability and high level of stress due to the fact that employees have to increase their operation level.
- The enterprise has failed to take advantage of external opportunities, focus on internal strengths, and has ignored competence threats—leading to further mismanagement and disorganization.
- The organization has developed too fast for its internal operation, so it needs to pause and restructure.

=== Divestiture ===
Divestiture is when the company sells some of its assets to accomplish a certain objective, such as higher returns or reduces debts. Usually, companies that implement this strategy want to invest that capital to create higher future revenue. This strategy has helped some organizations to get more focused on their core business and improve their performance in the market. It is common that enterprises sell their poorly assets or divisions, but the global economic collapse forced them to negotiate even their valuable properties and goods. It is similar to the retrenchment tool, but divestiture actions don't directly fire employees to cut costs.

For example, in 2009 Ailing Lehman Brothers Holdings divested its venture-capital division as the firm sold part of the assets to generate enough cash to pay their debts. The acquiring firm, HarbourVEst Partners LLC, changed the name of the Lehman division to Tenaya Capital.

=== Liquidation ===
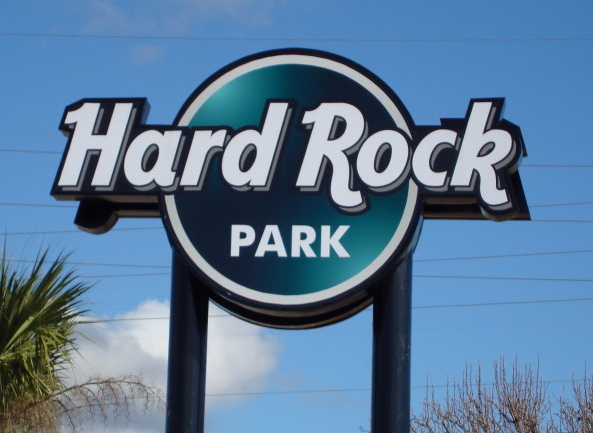
Hard Rock Park in Myrtle Beach, South Carolina. This park was liquidated in 2009.

Liquidation is the hardest strategy to perform by a company because it means that it went into bankruptcy. This can be caused because the operation and administration of the firm was not appropriate or the managers were not trained enough to control the activities of the firm. In this case, the unique solution is to sell all the company's assets in small parts to shareholders, stakeholders or other companies that are economically solvent. Although this is a tough decision, it is better to stop the operational chaos instead of continuing losing more money.

For example, in 2009 the Hard Rock Park in Myrtle Beach located in South Carolina was liquidated just nine months after its inauguration, despite two years of construction. Promoters expected that this thematic park would be the greatest in South Carolina, but it only generated $20 million in ticket sales—far below the $24 million in annual interest they owed. They had projected at least 30,000 customers per day, but tourist were not interested in the attractions, and the owners lost huge amounts of money.

== Dimensions ==
There are five dimensions of defensive strategy:

| Dimension | Meaning | Items for measuring |
|---|---|---|
| Personal communication | Sharing important information and having an effective communication between seller and buyer or customer. | Personal communication to customers. - Time designated for effective communication with customer.; Process for an effective communication: Customer can complain or show happiness through communication. |
| Firm-customer's trust development | Confidence between employees inside the organization and with the customer. | Trust the employees to achieve the organization's goals.; Give reliable information to customers.; Know that customers are trustworthy. |
| Bonding development | Create bonds and a business relationship between the company and its clients. | Establish a long-term relationship with the customers.; Cooperation to have an adequate control of the company. |
| Customer complaint management | The company's ability to deal with potential customer complaints to maintain its reputation | The enterprise provides a division for customer service.; The company has the responsibility to train its employees so they can deal with customer's discontent.; Firms gives compensation if customers have a reason to complain. |
| Switching barriers | The company generates barriers to maintain profitability and keep customers. | The customer feels happy and trust the company's products or services.; The organization gives discount for continuous buyers.; Originality of the firm's brand and product. This can give the company a competitive advantage. |
