= Premium pricing =

Pricing strategy

Premium pricing (also called image pricing or prestige pricing) is the practice of keeping the price of one of the products or service artificially high in order to encourage favorable perceptions among buyers, based solely on the price. Premium refers to a segment of a company's brands, products, or services that carry tangible or imaginary surplus value in the upper mid- to high price range. The practice is intended to exploit the tendency for buyers to assume that expensive items enjoy an exceptional reputation or represent exceptional quality and distinction. A premium pricing strategy involves setting the price of a product higher than similar products. This strategy is sometimes also called skim pricing because it is an attempt to “skim the cream” off the top of the market. It is used to maximize profit in areas where customers are happy to pay more, where there are no substitutes for the product, where there are barriers to entering the market or when the seller cannot save on costs by producing at a high volume.

Luxury has a psychological association with premium pricing. The implication for marketing is that consumers are willing to pay more for certain goods and not for others. To the marketer, it means creating a brand equity or value for which the consumer is willing to pay extra. Marketers view luxury as the main factor differentiating a brand in a product category. In travel a premium fare is charged for varying amenities which may include departure times (congestion pricing) or upgrades to the location or services the traveler has access to.

== Strategic considerations ==
The use of premium pricing as either a marketing strategy or a competitive practice depends on certain factors that influence its profitability and sustainability. Such factors include:

- Information asymmetry (e.g., when buyers have no independent basis to test claims of "exceptional quality" for a particular product or service—assuming the concept is well-defined to begin with);
- Market status as a luxury good, aspirational brand, or a superior good;
- Market dynamics such as the level of competition and entry barriers.

The disadvantages of this pricing strategy include:

- not practical for commodity goods

== Premium segment ==
Premium brands are designed to convey an impression of exclusivity or rarity, especially in the mass markets. Targeted customer groups can be high or average income; especially the latter can be premium-aware but on the lookout for bargains. Frequently, companies will invent various (sub)brands to differentiate their product lines into premium and general segments (as, for example, Toyota does with its Lexus marque) or even premium, mid-tier, and general segments (such as Lincoln, the defunct Mercury and Ford for the Ford Motor Company). In most ways, the premium segment can be thought of as the complement of value brands. The success of a brand is determined by the combination of aforesaid category and the market share. In that sense, the term "premium" replaces the traditional attribute "luxury," although the former can be perceived as less ostentatious.
