= ECRM =

Electronic customer relationship management

The eCRM or electronic customer relationship management encompasses all standard CRM functions with the use of the net environment i.e., intranet, extranet and internet. Electronic CRM concerns all forms of managing relationships with customers through the use of information technology (IT).

eCRM processes include data collection, data aggregation, and customer interaction. Compared to traditional CRM, the integrated information for eCRM intraorganizational collaboration can be more efficient to communicate with customers.

== From RM to CRM ==
The concept of relationship marketing (RM) was established by marketing professor Leonard Berry in 1983. He considered it to consist of attracting, maintaining and enhancing customer relationships within organizations. In the years that followed, companies were engaging more and more in a meaningful dialogue with individual customers. In doing so, new organizational forms as well as technologies were used, eventually resulting in what we know as customer relationship management.

The main difference between CRM and e-CRM is that the first does not acknowledge the use of technology, where the latter uses information technology (IT) in implementing RM strategies.

== The essence of CRM ==
The exact meaning of CRM is still subject of heavy discussions. However, the overall goal can be seen as effectively managing differentiated relationships with all customers and communicating with them on an individual basis. Underlying thought is that companies realize that they can supercharge profits by acknowledging that different groups of customers vary widely in their behavior, desires, and responsiveness to marketing.

Loyal customers can not only give operational companies sustained revenue but also advertise for new marketers. To reinforce the reliance of customers and create additional customer sources, firms utilize CRM to maintain the relationship as the general two categories B2B (business-to-business) and B2C (business-to-customer or business-to-consumer). Because of the needs and behaviors are different between B2B and B2C, the implementation of CRM should come from respective viewpoints.

== Differences from CRM ==
Major differences between CRM and eCRM:

Customer contacts

- CRM – Contact with customer made through the retail store, phone, and fax.
- eCRM – All of the traditional methods are used in addition to Internet, email, wireless, and PDA technologies.

System interface

- CRM – Implements the use of ERP systems, emphasis is on the back-end.
- eCRM – Geared more toward front end, which interacts with the back-end through use of ERP systems, data warehouses, and data marts.

System overhead (client computers)

- CRM – The client must download various applications to view the web-enabled applications. They would have to be rewritten for different platform.
- eCRM – Does not have these requirements because the client uses the browser.

Customization and personalization of information

- CRM – Views differ based on the audience, and personalized views are not available. Individual personalization requires program changes.
- eCRM – Personalized individual views based on purchase history and preferences. Individual has ability to customize view.

System focus

- CRM – System (created for internal use) designed based on job function and products. Web applications designed for a single department or business unit.
- eCRM – System (created for external use) designed based on customer needs. Web application designed for enterprise-wide use.

System maintenance and modification

- CRM – More time involved in implementation and maintenance is more expensive because the system exists at different locations and on various servers.
- eCRM – Reduction in time and cost. Implementation and maintenance can take place at one location and on one server.

by MalleBevax

== eCRM ==
As the Internet is becoming more and more important in business life, multiple companies consider it as an opportunity to reduce customer-service costs, tighten customer relationships and most important, further personalize marketing messages and enable mass customization. ECRM is being adopted by companies because it increases customer loyalty and customer retention by improving customer satisfaction, one of the objectives of eCRM. E-loyalty results in long-term profits for online retailers because they incur less costs of recruiting new customers, plus they have an increase in customer retention. Together with the creation of sales force automation (SFA), where electronic methods were used to gather data and analyze customer information, the trend of the upcoming Internet can be seen as the foundation of what we know as eCRM today.

As we implement eCRM process, there are three steps life cycle:

1. Data collection: About customers preference information for actively (answer knowledge) and passively (surfing record) ways via website, email, questionnaire.
2. Data aggregation: Filter and analysis for firm's specific needs to fulfill their customers.
3. Customer interaction: According to customer's need, company provide the proper feedback to them.

eCRM can be defined as activities to manage customer relationships by using the Internet, web browsers or other electronic touch points. The challenge hereby is to offer communication and information on the right topic, in the right amount, and at the right time that fits the customer's specific needs.

=== Strategy components ===
When enterprises integrate their customer information, there are three eCRM strategy components:

1. Operational: Because of sharing information, the processes in business should make customer's need as first and seamlessly implement. This avoids multiple times to bother customers and redundant process.
2. Analytical: Analysis helps company maintain a long-term relationship with customers.
3. Collaborative: Due to improved communication technology, different departments in company implement (intraorganizational) or work with business partners (interorganizational) more efficiently by sharing information. (Nenad Jukic et al., 2003)

=== Implementing and integrating ===
==== Non-electronic solution ====
Several CRM software packages exist that can help companies in deploying CRM activities. Besides choosing one of these packages, companies can also choose to design and build their own solutions. In order to implement CRM in an effective way, one needs to consider the following factors:

- Create a customer-focused culture in the organization.
- Adopt customer-based managers to assess satisfaction.
- Develop an end-to-end process to serve customers.
- Recommend questions to be asked to help a customer solve a problem.
- Track all aspects of selling to customers, as well as prospects.

Furthermore, CRM solutions are more effective once they are being implemented in other information systems used by the company. Examples are transaction processing system (TPS) to process data real-time, which can then be sent to the sales and finance departments in order to recalculate inventory and financial position quick and accurately. Once this information is transferred back to the CRM software and services it could prevent customers from placing an order in the belief that an item is in stock while it is not.

==== Cloud solution ====
Today, more and more enterprise CRM systems move to cloud computing solution, "up from 8 percent of the CRM market in 2005 to 20 percent of the market in 2008, according to Gartner". Moving managing system into cloud, companies can cost efficiently as pay-per-use on manage, maintain, and upgrade etc. system and connect with their customers streamlined in the cloud. In cloud based CRM system, transaction can be recorded via CRM database immediately.

Some enterprise CRM in cloud systems are web-based customers don't need to install an additional interface and the activities with businesses can be updated real-time. People may communicate on mobile devices to get the efficient services. Furthermore, customer/case experience and the interaction feedbacks are another way of CRM collaboration and integration information in corporate organization to improve businesses’ services.

Factors considered when selecting a cloud-based CRM system include organizational requirements, cost, trial availability, mobile compatibility, security controls, employee adoption, and vendor support.

1. Assess your company's needs: some of enterprise CRM systems are featured
2. Take advantage of free trials: comparison and familiarization each of the optional.
3. Do the math: estimate the customer strategy for company budget.
4. Consider mobile options: some system like Salesforce.com can be combined with other mobile device application.
5. Ask about security: consider whether the cloud CRM solution provides as much protection as your own system.
6. Make sure the sales team is on board: as the frontline of enterprise, the launched CRM system should be the help for sales.
7. Know your exit strategy: understand the exit mechanism to keep flexibility.

=== vCRM ===
Channels through which companies can communicate with its customers, are growing by the day, and as a result, their time and attention has turned into a challenge. One of the reasons eCRM is popular nowadays is that digital channels can create unique and positive experiences – not just transactions – for customers. An example of the creation of experiences in order to establish customer service is the use of Virtual Worlds, such as Second Life. Through this so-called vCRM, companies are able to create synergies between virtual and physical channels and reaching a wide consumer base. However, given the newness of the technology, most companies are still struggling to identify effective entries in Virtual Worlds. Its interactive character, which allows companies to respond directly to any customer's requests or problems, is another feature of eCRM that helps companies establish and sustain long-term customer relationships.

Furthermore, Information Technology has helped companies to even further differentiate between customers and address a personal message or service. Some examples of tools used in eCRM:

- Personalized Web Pages where customers are recognized and their preferences are shown.
- Customized products or services.

CRM programs should be directed towards customer value that competitors cannot match. However, in a world where almost every company is connected to the Internet, eCRM has become a requirement for survival, not just a competitive advantage.

== Different levels ==
In defining the scope of eCRM, three different levels can be distinguished:

- Foundational services:

This includes the minimum necessary services such as web site effectiveness and responsiveness as well as order fulfillment.

- Customer-centered services:

These services include order tracking, product configuration and customization as well as security/trust.

- Value-added services:

These are extra services such as online auctions and online training and education.

Self-services are becoming increasingly important in CRM activities. The rise of the Internet and eCRM has boosted the options for self-service activities. A critical success factor is the integration of such activities into traditional channels. An example was Ford's plan to sell cars directly to customers via its Web Site, which provoked an outcry among its dealers network. CRM activities are mainly of two different types. Reactive service is where the customer has a problem and contacts the company. Proactive service is where the manager has decided not to wait for the customer to contact the firm, but to be aggressive and contact the customer himself in order to establish a dialogue and solve problems.

Steps to eCRM Success

Many factors play a part in ensuring that the implementation any level of eCRM is successful. One obvious way it could be measured is by the ability for the system to add value to the existing business. There are four suggested implementation steps that affect the viability of a project like this:

1. Developing customer-centric strategies
2. Redesigning workflow management systems
3. Re-engineering work processes
4. Supporting with the right technologies

== Mobile CRM ==
One subset of Electronic CRM is Mobile CRM (mCRM). This is defined as "services that aim at nurturing customer relationships, acquiring or maintaining customers, support marketing, sales or services processes, and use wireless networks as the medium of delivery to the customers. However, since communications is the central aspect of customer relations activities, some opt for the following definition of mCRM: "communication, either one-way or interactive, which is related to sales, marketing and customer service activities conducted through mobile medium for the purpose of building and maintaining customer relationships between a company and its customer(s).

eCRM allows customers to access company services from more and more places, since the Internet access points are increasing by the day. mCRM however, takes this one step further and allows customers or managers to access the systems for instance from a mobile phone or PDA with internet access, resulting in high flexibility.

Since mCRM is not able to provide a complete range of customer relationship activities it should be integrated in the complete CRM system.

There are four basic steps that a company should follow to implement a mobile CRM system. By following these and also keeping the IT department, the end users and management in agreement, the outcome can be beneficial for all.

Step 1 – Needs analysis phase: This is the point at which companies take their time to understand all the technical needs and desires for each of the users and stakeholders. They also must try to leave room for the mobile CRM to grow and develop.

Step 2 – Mobile design phase: This is the next critical phase that will show all the technical concerns that need to be addressed. A few main things to consider are screen size, device storage and security.

Step 3 – Mobile application testing phase: This step is mostly to ensure that the users and stakeholders all approve of the new system.

Step 4 – Rollout phase: This is when the new system is implemented but also when training on the final product is done with all users.

Advantages of mobile CRM

1. The mobile channel creates a more personal direct connection with customers.
2. It is continuously active and allows necessary individuals to take action quickly using the information.
3. Typically it is an opt-in only channel which allows for high and quality responsiveness.
4. Overall it supports loyalty between the customer and company, which improves and strengthens relationships.

== Failures ==
Designing, creating and implementing IT projects has always been risky. Not only because of the amount of money that is involved, but also because of the high chances of failure. However, a positive trend can be seen, indicating that CRM failures dropped from a failure rate of 80% in 1998, to about 40% in 2003. Some of the major issues relating to CRM failure are the following:

- Difficulty in measuring and valuing intangible benefits.
- Failure to identify and focus on specific business problems.
- Lack of active senior management sponsorship.
- Poor user acceptance.
- Trying to automate a poorly defined process.

Failure rates in CRM from 2001 to 2009:

- 2001- 50% failure rate according to the Gartner group
- 2002- 70% failure rate according to Butler group
- 2003- 69.3% according to Selling Power, CSO Forum
- 2004- 18% according to AMR Research group
- 2005- 31% according to AMR Research
- 2006- 29% according to AMR Research
- 2007- 56% according to Economist Intelligence Unit
- 2009- 47% according to Forrester Research

Differing measurement criteria and methods of the research groups make it difficult to compare these rates. Most of these rates were based on customer response pertaining to questions on the success of CRM implementations.

== Privacy ==
The effective and efficient employment of CRM activities cannot go without the remarks of safety and privacy. CRM systems depend on databases in which all kinds of customer data is stored. In general, the following rule applies: the more data, the better the service companies can deliver to individual customers. Some known examples of these problems are conducting credit-card transaction online of the phenomenon known as 'cookies' used on the Internet in order to track someone's information and behavior. The design and the quality of the website are two important aspects that influence the level of trust customers experience and their willingness or reluctance to conduct a transaction or leave personal information.

Privacy policies can be ineffective in relaying to customers how much of their information is being used. In a recent study by The University of Pennsylvania and University of California, it was revealed that over half the respondents have an incorrect understanding of how their information is being used. They believe that, if a company has a privacy policy, they will not share the customer's information with third-party companies without the customer's express consent. Therefore, if marketers want to use consumer information for advertising purposes, they must clearly illustrate the ways in which they will use the customer's information and present the benefits of this in order to acquire the customer's consent. Privacy concerns are being addressed more and more. Legislation is being proposed that regulates the use of personal data. Also, Internet policy officials are calling for more performance measures of privacy policies.

Statistics on privacy:

- 38% of retailers don't talk about privacy in their sign up or welcome email
- About 50% of major online retailers discuss privacy concerns during the email subscription process

As the use of the Internet, electronic CRM solutions, and even the existence of e-business are rising, so are the efforts to further develop the systems being used and to increase their safety for customers, in order to further reap the benefits of their use.

== See also ==
- Customer relationship management
- Comparison of CRM systems
- Customer lifecycle management
- B2B
- B2C
- Cloud computing
- Enterprise resource planning
