= Construction Marketing Association =

- Logo
- Abbreviation: CMA
- Formation: 2010
- Headquarters: 1220 Iroquois Avenue #210
- Location: Naperville, Illinois, United States

The Construction Marketing Association (CMA) is an association for marketing professionals in the construction industry, based in Naperville, Illinois, in the United States. CMA offers educational resources through its training division, the Construction Marketing Institute. The association was established in 2010 and has around 1,000 members throughout North America and abroad.

== Activities ==
In 2010, CMA announced the Construction Brand Internet Index (CBII), a "comprehensive rating of the Internet presence" of leading construction brands based on more than fifty variables. The rating identifies the effectiveness of one website relative to others. The association also hosts webcast training events, including the Social Media Summit – Construction, and hosts "Construction Marketing Blog" and other marketing resources such as the CMA Career Center. Marketing professionals may obtain certification through the association's "Certified Construction Marketing Professional" (CCMP) program. In 2014, CMA announced a national survey regarding request for proposal (RFP) effectiveness and best practices, identifying how architectural, construction, and engineering companies manage RFP processes and industry trends. In 2015, the association managed the inaugural Construction Americas Exposition, which was presented by Florida International University's OHL School of Construction.

The association presents the Construction Marketing Star awards and Construction Marketer of the Year awards annually, recognizing "marketing excellence of construction industry professionals across a broad range of functional marketing disciplines". The awards program has 16 categories and more than 75 subcategories. Entries are judged by a panel of volunteer CMA members. Awards may be presented to CMA members and non-members; recipients receive a metallic embossed certificate and optional gold-plated statuette.
