= Intermarket segmentation =

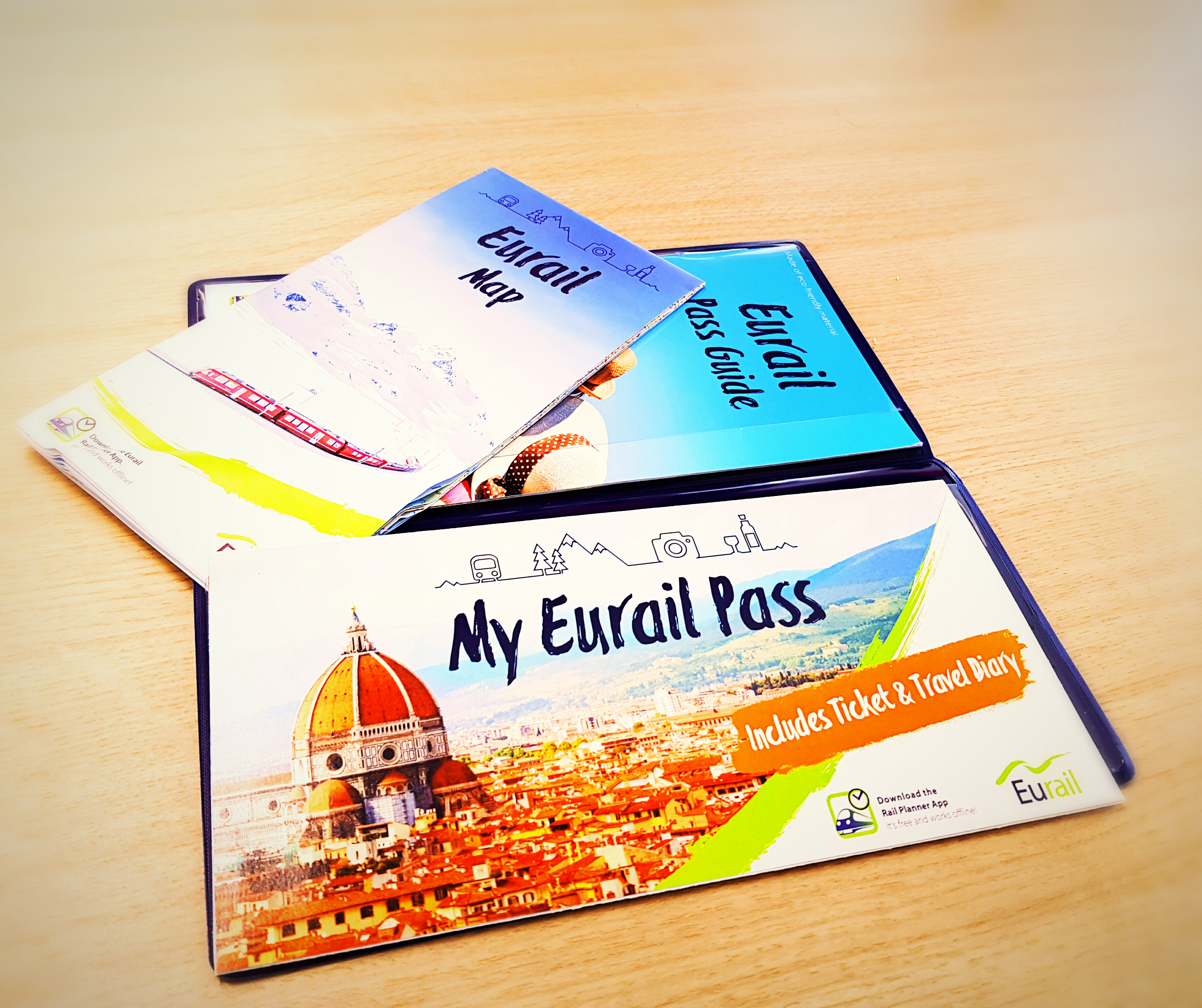
Eurail rail pass for non-European residents worldwide

Intermarket segmentation refers to forming segments of consumers who have similar needs and buying behaviour, even though they are located in different countries. It is the process of selecting consumer segments across a range of countries that are targeted with an integrated brand positioning strategy without regard to geographic or national boundaries. The concept was originally coined and defined in a 1991 article published by The Academy of Marketing Science by Dr. Salah S. Hassan, Professor of Global Brand Strategy at George Washington University.
