= Community marketing =

Community marketing is a strategy to engage an audience in an active, non-intrusive prospect and customer conversation. Whereas marketing communication strategies such as advertising, promotion, PR, and sales all focus on attaining customers, Community Marketing focuses on the needs of existing customers. This accomplishes four things for a business:

- Connects existing customers with prospects
- Connects prospects with each other
- Connects a company with customers/prospects to solidify loyalty
- Connects customers with customers to improve product adoption, satisfaction, etc.

There are two types of community marketing:

- Organic (created by users with no company intervention)
- Sponsored (fostered and hosted by a company)

Recent skepticism building among consumers as a result of blatant advertising and other unethical communications has affected the success of the sponsored form of Community Marketing. Continuing success in community marketing strategies has been found in engaging and cultivating the natural communities that form around their product/service.

== Benefits ==
- Bi-directional communication with customers - Resulting in increased feedback, identification of customer needs, and a customer-focused product development
- Reduced Communication Barriers - Easily introduce messaging to customer audience regarding new products, Public relations strategies, or Damage control (news)
- Identify, engage, and leverage Advocates - Allow enthused and loyal customers to benefit your overall marketing through Word of mouth and Knowledge Management that reduces the load on your internal support mechanisms (particularly for tech products).
- Gaining Trusted Advisor Status - Reduced skepticism towards your marketing message as a result of a demonstrated openness, transparency, and commitment to customer focus through Community Marketing involvement. Results in an "ownership" of the discussion surrounding a product/service that reduces negativity and positions the providing company as a resource, rather than simply a vendor.

== Tools used in community marketing ==
- Online Social Networking - The chief medium for Community Marketing revolves around Web 2.0 interactivity such as Internet forums, Wiki's, Social networks, Blogs, and related syndication (RSS).
- Community-Specific Tools & Features - To encourage community participation, many companies offer tools and features exclusively to "members" of the community. These include Webcasts, Podcasts, and email bulletins. The key factor, however, in using these tools is the value of the message. Communities revolve around user-valuable messages (information, support, tips & tricks, etc.) and NOT promotional messages.
- Community Infrastructure and Governance - Some communities engage the participation of their customers in the role of elected officials, advisory board members, and volunteer "guru" status in order to exemplify key customers in their communities.
- Partnerships - Although this is often a purely Public relations strategy, some people view partnerships with non-profit consumer advocacy organizations to be a Community Marketing effort.
