= Customer acquisition cost =

Cost of persuading a customer to purchase a product or service

Customer acquisition cost (CAC) is the cost of persuading a customer to purchase a product or service. As an important business metric, customer acquisition costs are often related to customer lifetime value (CLV or LTV).

With CAC, a company can estimate how much they are spending on acquiring each customer. It shows the money spent on marketing, salaries, and related expenses to acquire a customer. For example, a company spending $500 to acquire a new customer with an expected LTV of $300 means the company is losing an estimated $200 per customer acquired.

CAC, combined with LTV is a frequently compared metric, particularly for SaaS companies. They can manage their expenses, see their growth, predict their future moves, and expand if the business allows.

== Calculating customer acquisition costs ==
There is both a simple and a complex method for calculating acquisition costs.

=== Simple method ===
The simple method divides the total marketing costs to acquire new customers by the total number of customers acquired in a defined period. $CAC=\frac{MCC}{CA}$

- CAC = Customer Acquisition Cost
- MCC = total marketing cost for acquiring new customers
- CA = total customers acquired

=== Complex method ===
In addition to the costs incurred in marketing, the complex method includes sales and marketing wages, software costs for sales and marketing, all additional professional services such as designers, consultants, etc., as well as other overhead costs. $CAC=\frac{MCC + W + S + PS + O}{CA}$

- CAC = Customer Acquisition Cost
- MCC = total marketing cost for acquiring new customers
- W = wages connected with sales and marketing
- S = all the marketing and sales associated software cost (inc. E-Commerce-Platform, automated marketing, A / B-testing, analytics etc.)
- PS = every additional professional service in marketing / sales (Designer, consultant, etc.)
- O = other overheads associated with marketing and sales
- CA = total customers acquired

== Customer acquisition costs in relation to customer lifetime value ==
Customer lifetime value expresses the monetary value that a customer is worth to the company in the course of a customer relationship. The LTV to CAC ratio (LTV / CAC) can be used to gauge marketing efficiency:

- 1:1 – The company loses money (if the cost of providing the service is taken into account)
- Less than 1:1 – The company gets into financial difficulties because more is paid for customers than they are worth.
- 3:1 - A very good level because the customer relationships are solid and customers are acquired for the right price.
- Higher than 3:1 – The company has untapped growth potential to acquire customers.

== Customer acquisition costs in the environment of start-ups and venture capital ==
In the approach and review phase of venture capital companies to start-ups, the CAC and LTV ratios can be of great importance depending on what type of market or product is produced.

== See also ==
- Customer lifetime value
- Customer acquisition management
- Customer lifecycle management
- Performance metric
- Controlling
- Marketing
- Sales
- Venture capital
- Software as a service (SaaS)
