= 3 A.M. =

3 A.M. or 3AM may refer to:

- a time in the 12-hour clock
- one definition of the witching hour

== Film and television ==
- 3 A.M. (2001 film), an American crime film
- 3 A.M. 3D, a 2012 Thai horror 3D film
- 3 A.M. (2014 film), a Hindi musical horror film
- 3AM (TV series), a 2015 American reality documentary series
- "3AM" (The Punisher), an episode of The Punisher

== Music ==
- 3 A.M, the 2012 debut album by Cali y El Dandee
- "3 a.m." (Eminem song), 2009
- "3AM" (Kleerup song), 2008
- "3am" (Loe Shimmy and Don Toliver song), 2025
- "3AM" (Matchbox Twenty song), 1997
- "3AM (Pull Up)", a 2017 song by Charli XCX
- "Thunderbirds / 3AM", a 2004 single by Busted
- "3AM", a 2018 song by Baauer, AJ Tracey and Jae Stephens
- "3AM", a song by Halsey from the 2020 album Manic
- "3 A.M.", a song by Jesse & Joy from the 2015 album Un Besito Más
- "3AM", a song by Kate Nash from the 2013 album Girl Talk
- "3am", a song by Meghan Trainor from the 2015 album Title
- "3 A.M.", a song by NF from the 2017 album Perception
- "3 A.M.", a song by King Von, from the 2020 album Levon James
- "3am", a song by Rosé from the 2024 album Rosie
- "3 A.M.", a song by Young Jeezy from the 2006 album The Inspiration

== Poetry ==
- Monologue At 3 AM, by Sylvia Plath
- Another Mid-Life Crisis, by Roger McGough (refers to 3AM)

== Other uses ==
- 3:AM Magazine, a Paris-based magazine
- Children (advertisement), a 2008 American political advertisement also known as "3:00AM"

== See also ==
- The 3AM Girls, gossip columnists for The Daily Mirror
- "3 a.m. Eternal", song by the KLF
