= Product proliferation =

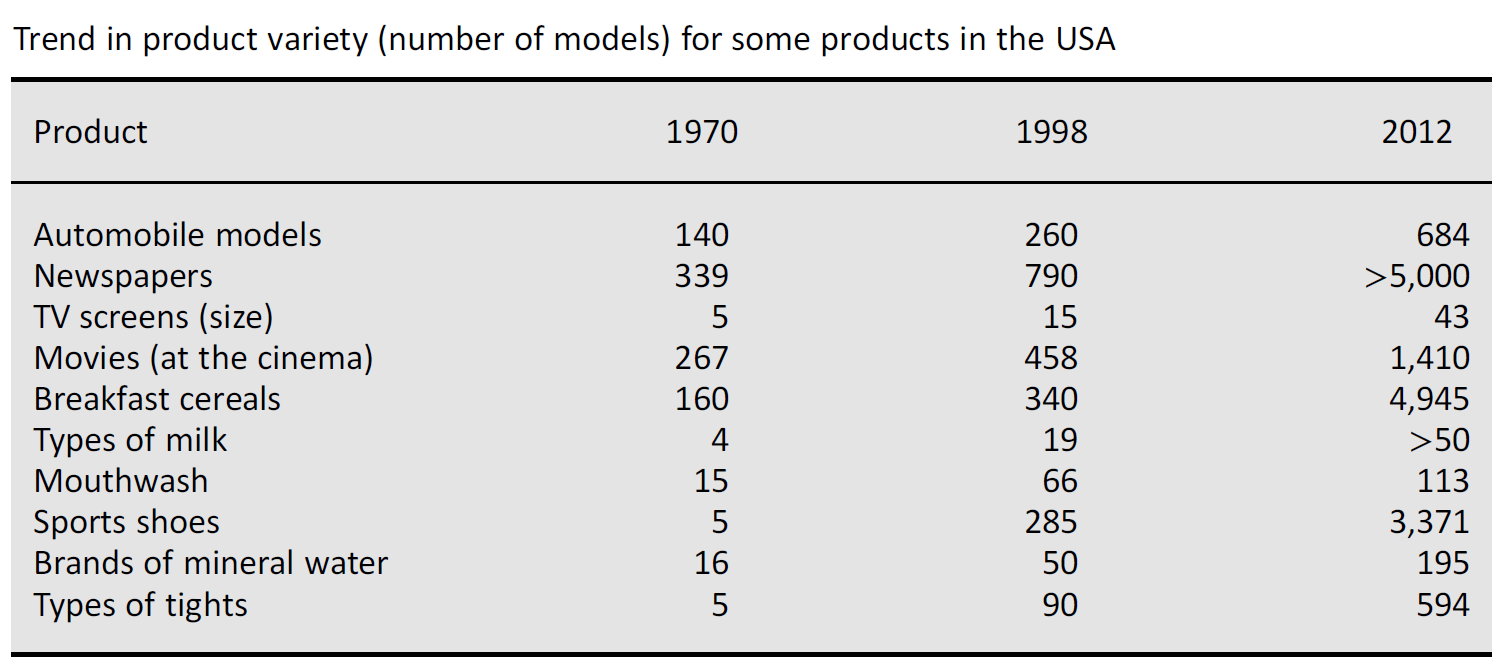
Trend in product variety for some models in the United States

Product proliferation occurs when organizations market many variations of the same products. This can be done through different colour combinations, product sizes and different product uses. This produces diversity for the firm as it is able to capture its sizable portion of the market. However, it can also be considered that marketing so many new products leads to economic resources being wasted; the consumer becomes confused and mistakes are made in the purchase of products. Other problems associated with product proliferation include higher production, higher inventory and larger record-keeping costs.

The very dynamism of product proliferation makes it hard to manage. Complexity is spawned by an ever-changing landscape of customer demand and companies' attempts to meet that demand with configurable products and more product variations.

Product proliferation can sometimes also lead to cannibalisation of the existing product line of the company and should be justified by overall increase in market share.
