= Aspirational brand =

Brand or product that many people want but can't own

An aspirational brand is a term in consumer marketing for a brand or product which a large segment of its exposure audience wishes to own, but for economic reasons cannot. Because the desire for aspirational goods is relative to the consumer's purchasing power, an aspirational brand may be a luxury good if the person desires it, or it may simply be any product whether luxury or not if a consumer has less spending money.

The premise of this type of marketing is that purchase decisions are made at an emotional level, to enhance self-concept.

== Target audience ==
A defining feature of an aspirational product is that its target customer base cannot easily afford to purchase it, but may be able to purchase it with sacrifice or at some point in the future.

This part of the exposure audience is referred to as the aspirational audience, whereas the part of the exposure audience that already can afford the product is called the consumption audience. Consumption audience and aspirational audience together form the aspirational product's target audience, which typically represents 30%-60% of the exposure audience.

Weak aspirational brands have target audiences that are almost as large as their exposure audiences (e.g., many consumer electronics brands), and are thus slowly becoming commodity brands (whose consumption audiences coincide with their exposure audiences, thereby lacking an aspiring audience).

== Pricing ==
As a general rule, an aspirational brand and its products can command premium pricing in the marketplace over a commodity brand. This ability can to a large extent be explained by the consumer's need for conspicuous consumption for which he is willing to pay a price premium. The smaller the size of the product's target audience compared to the exposure audience, the more the product satisfies this need, and the higher the premium that such a consumer is prepared to pay.

To keep the premium level of a brand high, the consumption portion of the audience should not exceed 30% of the aspirational audience.

== Aspirational brand strategy ==
Aspirational brand strategies are employed to re-position a brand within a marketplace. The idea is that brand can lead organizational change and lead consumer opinion about a brand. Aspirational brand strategies are used when the current image of the brand is either negative or no longer relevant to the company.

One study examined interaction with brands on Facebook, and noted that user interaction in that platform with brands in general and asprirational brands specifically did not match marketplace purchasing behavior in an obvious way.
