= Geographical pricing =

Average gasoline prices by country

Geographical pricing, in marketing, is the practice of modifying a basic list price based on the geographical location of the buyer. It is intended to reflect the costs of shipping to different locations. There are several ways to apply the cost of shipping to the prices.

== FOB origin ==
With FOB (Free on Board) origin (or FOB plant) pricing, the shipping cost from the factory or warehouse is paid by the purchaser. Ownership of the goods is transferred to the buyer as soon as it is placed aboard a common carrier. Typically the choice of carrier is made by the buyer. FOB pricing is utilized by larger businesses capable of arranging their own logistics and marketing intermediaries.

With a variation of the FOB pricing called FOB origin-freight allowed or freight absorbed, the terms allow buyers to subtract all or part of the cost of transportation from their bills. This amounts to a price discount, and is used as a market expansion tactic by the companies with high fixed costs.

== Uniform delivered pricing ==
Uniform delivered pricing is the opposite of the FOB origin pricing, as the same price is quoted to all customers. The transportation costs are averaged across all buyers, and the nearby customers are in effect subsidizing the faraway ones (paying more for the delivery than it costs the seller, the difference is called the phantom freight). This approach resembles the fees for the first-class mail service, thus uniform pricing has another name, postage stamp pricing.

== Zone pricing ==
Zone pricing (also zonal pricing) is a variant of uniform pricing: the prices are the same within a "zone" (a geographical slice of the market), prices increase with the costs of shipping and reflect the average delivery cost inside the zone. This is the approach taken, for example, by the parcel delivery services. The zone pricing reduces the phantom freight, yet keeps the pricing structure relatively simple, thus making it easier for the seller to compete in a faraway market.

The definition of zones is sometimes done by drawing concentric circles on a map with the plant or warehouse at the center and each circle defining the boundary of a price zone. Instead of using circles, irregularly shaped price boundaries can be drawn that reflect geography, population density, transportation infrastructure, and shipping cost. (The term "zone pricing" can also refer to the practice of setting prices that reflect local competitive conditions, i.e., the market forces of supply and demand, rather than actual cost of transportation.)

=== Gasoline ===
Gasoline marketers find it profitable to map out zones by determining what price the local market can bear and charging the gas station owners different wholesale prices depending on the zone.

Zone pricing, as practiced in the gasoline industry in the United States, is the pricing of gasoline based on a complex and secret weighting of factors, such as the number of competing stations, number of vehicles, average traffic flow, population density, and geographic characteristics.

Many businesspeople and economists state that gasoline zone pricing merely reflects the costs of doing business in a complex and volatile marketplace. Critics contend that industry monopoly and the ability to control not only industry-owned "corporate" stations, but locally owned or franchise stations, make zone pricing into an excuse to raise gasoline prices virtually at will. Oil industry representatives contend that while they set wholesale and dealer tank wagon prices, individual dealers are free to see whatever prices they wish and that this practice in itself causes widespread price variations outside industry control.

== Basing-point pricing ==
With basing-point pricing, certain locations are designated as basing points. The quoted price includes the freight fees from the basing point closest to the customer (not necessarily being the place the product is actually shipped from). The well-known example was the "Pittsburgh-plus" scheme, where all steel deliveries in the US were priced as if the shipment originated in Pittsburgh, even as the steel manufacturing moved away from Pittsburgh. The basing-point pricing is unpopular with the buyers.

== See also ==
- Incoterms
- Geomarketing
- Distribution

== Sources ==
- Boone, Louis E.; Kurtz, David L. (1 January 2015). "Geographic considerations". Contemporary Marketing. Cengage Learning. pp. 634–635. ISBN 978-1-305-46546-6.
