= Price override =

A price override is a feature of a retail management system which allows an authorised person to change the automated price of a product or service, in order to apply a discount.

Price overrides occur for a variety of reasons. One common reason is to discount damaged goods. Another is employee discount and discounts given to other groups. An override may also be necessary due to the displayed price of an item not matching the price shown at the register. This can occur when staff have not caught up with changes to the display caused by recent price changes on the retail management system, or it may simply be a mistake. The customer is then given the old price for goodwill, or for legal reasons. Other reasons include coupon redemption and items on sale.

Price overrides can present an opportunity for employee fraud. Unauthorised large discounts can be given to associates of the employee. Alternatively, an employee can make the sale at the full price, then, after serving the customer, void the sale and enter it again, but this time with a discount which the employee pockets. For these reasons the ability to override prices is often limited to senior employees only, or alternatively, junior employees have a limit placed on the amount they can override, typically 10%. This can be further refined by the retail management system distinguishing between the various types of transactions and setting appropriate limits and controls for each individually.
