= Share of voice =

Advertising measurement model

Share of Voice in advertising is a measurement model within advertising. Share of voice measures the percentage of media spending by a company compared to the total media expenditure for the product, service, or category in the market. For example, if an electronics brand were to invest $5,000,000 advertising their latest e-reader, but $100,000,000 worth of advertising was spent advertising e-readers across the entire market for this shared category, then the 5 million dollar investment would equal a 5% share of voice.

Share of Voice can be calculated by taking your advertising spend and dividing it by the total of all market advertising spend for the same type of product or category.

Share of Voice is used to "represent the relative portion of ad inventory available to a single advertiser within a defined market over a specified time period."

== Theory ==
The goal of advertising is to make your target audience aware of your brand, product, or service and influence them to act. Therefore, having a high share of voice can lead to increased awareness, and ultimately, increased sales and market share.

From the perspective of publishers and those selling ad space, Share of Voice capitalizes on the concept of exclusivity. By limiting the number of ad space available on websites, email newsletters, and other media, ads are more likely to be seen by their target audiences. When you limit a website, for example, to 10 advertisers in each ad position with each paying equally, on average each advertiser will be seen at least once every 10 rotations.

Share of Voice is designed to create a mutually beneficial relationship between the advertiser and the web publisher. The advertiser is willing to pay a premium for exclusivity and less competition for their target audience's viewership. The publisher no longer has to rely on volume and can attract advertisers that want to specifically reach the publisher's audience.

Because the Share of Voice method values quality of ads over quantity of ads, publishers are perceived to have higher levels of credibility and interaction. When high quality content is presented, high quality advertisers tend to follow.

== Benefits versus pay-for-performance models ==
The share of voice advertising model is contrary to pay per click, cost per impression and/or pay to play (see brokered programming), which are pay-for-performance models that generate revenue for the publisher (typically, the website owner) only if the advertisement is clicked or viewed. The publisher is incentivized to seek out as many advertisers as possible, often on a bid-based system. Furthermore, Share of Voice bypasses the ethical dilemmas that come with PPC and CPI models, which are subject to abuse by click fraud, or Pay to Play tactics (advertorials, product placement, news coverage in exchange for ad purchases, etc) that are not always transparently paid ads.

When content is compromised for ad dollars, the level of reputation and respect for the publisher can dwindle as readers become disenfranchised and advertisers see less return on their initial investment.

== Share of Voice models ==
Share of Voice models can be contract models where ad placement and content are pre-negotiated. This way, advertisers have the option to have longer advertising campaigns where content does not need to change based on the availability of advertising space. Additionally, the publisher's non-ad content, i.e. in the case of a news publisher, is independent of the advertiser's marketing campaign, regardless of other sponsors or advertisers that work with the web publisher.

Share of Voice can also be employed to maximize a brand or group of brands' exposure via advertising weight expressed as a percentage of a defined total market or market segment in a given time period. The weight is usually defined in terms of expenditure, ratings, pages, poster sites etc.
