= GE multifactorial analysis =

Technique used in brand marketing and product management

GE multifactorial analysis is a technique used in brand marketing and product management to help a company decide what products to add to its portfolio and which opportunities in the market they should continue to invest in. It is conceptually similar to BCG analysis, but more complex with nine cells rather than four. Like in BCG analysis, a two-dimensional portfolio matrix is created. However, with the GE model the dimensions are multi factorial. One dimension comprises nine industry attractiveness measures; the other comprises twelve internal business strength measures. The GE matrix helps a strategic business unit evaluate its overall strength.

Each product, brand, service, or potential product is mapped in this industry attractiveness/business strength space. The GE multi-factor model or "nine-box matrix" was first developed by McKinsey for General Electric in the early 1970s.

== Aims of the GE model ==
This model aims to evaluate the existing portfolios of strategic business units and to develop strategies to achieve growth by addition of new products and businesses to this portfolio and further, to analyze which business units to invest in and which ones to sell off.

== Construction of the GE matrix ==
The GE matrix is constructed in a 3x3 grid with market attractiveness plotted on the Y-axis and business strength on the X-axis, both being measured on a high, medium, or low score. Five steps are considered in order to formulate the matrix;

- The range of products produced by the SBU (Strategic Business Unit) must be listed
- Factors which make the particular market attractive must be identified
- Evaluating where the SBU stands in this market
- Processes through which calculations about business strength and market attractiveness can be made
- Determining which category an SBU lies in: high, medium, or low.

=== Market attractiveness ===
The attractiveness of a market is demonstrated by how beneficial it is for a company to enter and compete within this market. It is based on various factors; the size of the market and the rate at which it is growing, the possibility of profit, the number of competitors within the industry and their weaknesses.

=== Business/competitive strength ===
This helps decide whether a company is competent enough to compete in the given markets. It can be determined by factors within the company itself such as its assets and holdings, the share it holds in the market and the development of this share, the position in the market of its brand and the loyalty of customers to this brand, its creativeness in coming up with new and improved products and in dealing with the fluctuating situations of the market, as well as keeping in mind environmental/government concerns such as energy consumption, waste disposal etc.

=== Measuring market attractiveness and business strength ===
Once the factors that determine the two are identified and rated, each factor is then given a certain magnitude and a calculation is made as follows; factor 1 rating x factor 1 magnitude + factor 2 rating x factor 2 magnitude + ..... factor n rating x factor n magnitude.

=== Plotting ===
SBU's in the matrix can be represented as a circle; the radius exhibits the size of the market, the SBU's holdings in the market are equated through a pie chart within the circle and an arrow outside the circle shows the standing of the SBU expected in the future. In the image attached for example, an SBU holds 45% of the market's shares. The arrow is outwards thus showing that the SBU is expected to grow and gain strength and then its tip indicates the future position of the SBU.

== Investment strategies ==
When considering investment, it must first be seen which box of the matrix an SBU falls in: grow, selectivity, or harvest.

=== Grow ===
SBUs that are classified into this category attract various company's investment as they are expected to yield high returns in the future. These investments should be split into categories such as research and development, acquisition of other SBU's, extensive advertisements and expanding production capacity.

=== Selectivity ===
SBUs that hold a lot of ambiguity fall into this category. They are usually only invested in if there is any prospect of competencies in managerial and corporate capabilities and if companies have any money left after investments in 'grow' business units.

=== Harvest ===
SBUs performing poorly in unattractive industries are classified into this category. Companies only invest in them if they generate enough cash to equal the investment amount, otherwise, they may be liquidated.

== Advantages ==
- Raises awareness between managers about the performance of their products in the market and aids in developing strategies to get maximum returns from the resources available.
- Helps extract information about a business unit's strengths and weaknesses and to devise strategies to accelerate and improve performance.
- Aids the business in growing and in providing information about potential market opportunities.
- It is more complex in comparison to the BCG matrix.

== Limitations ==
- There is no set rule to 'weight' factors and this process may be subjective across different business unit's. For example, the weight given to a factor by one business may be different to the weight/importance given to it by another.
- The formulation of a GE matrix is very expensive and time-consuming.
- Investment strategies are often not implemented in an accurate and proper manner.
- The dynamics among SBUs themselves are not taken into account.

== Comparison with the BCG matrix ==
When compared to the BCG matrix consisting of four cells, the GE matrix, with nine cells, is more complex. This means it not only takes longer to construct, but also to implement. The BCG matrix is much simpler and the factors needed to construct it are accessed more easily and quickly. It takes into account a wide range of factors when determining market attractiveness and business strengths, which is replaced by market share and market growth in the BCG matrix. Also, whereas factors are classified in the GE matrix as high, medium and low, those in the BCG matrix are divided between high and low. This aspect of the BCG matrix is considered one of its more significant limitations because "middle positions" often arise. The G.E matrix also overcomes many of the other limitations and constraints of the BCG matrix.
