= Competitor indexing =

Competitor indexing is a price setting technique used by marketers, in which a firm pegs the prices of its products to those of a competitor. This may involve matching competitors' prices, or setting prices at a fixed amount or percentage above or below. This strategy may be used by fringe firms in industries with one or two dominant companies, or in price-sensitive industries such as food retail, and is sometimes referred to as the "follow the leader" strategy.

One advantage of competitor indexing is convenience, as extensive marketing research and statistical analysis are not required. The main disadvantage is that it is purely reactive. Price cannot be used as a variable when constructing a marketing mix: it becomes a constant over which the firm has no control.

== See also ==
- Pricing
- Competitor analysis
- Marketing
- Marketing mix
- Oligopoly
