= Purchase funnel =

Model of theoretical customer journey toward purchase of a good or service

An example of a typical purchase funnel

The purchase funnel, or purchasing funnel, is a consumer-focused marketing model that illustrates the theoretical customer journey toward the purchase of a good or service.

This staged process is summarized below:

- Awareness – When a prospective customer becomes aware that a seller offers a product, solution, or service that will meet their needs, they are in the awareness stage. This can happen through advertising, word of mouth, prospect research, or any of several other channels. After becoming aware, the prospect will begin to consider how they can find an appropriate solution to their problem.
- Interest – When a prospect expresses interest in a service, they go through an evaluation process in which they seek more information, compare the offerings of various competitors, and become more educated about the factors surrounding the offering. At this level, a seller must provide the prospect with a compelling argument for the effectiveness of their product.
- Desire – Getting a prospect to make a decision boils down to giving them all the information they need, answering any questions that are holding them back from taking action, assuaging any fears they may have, and convincing them that the action they’re about to take will result in satisfaction. This is the level at which the seller must demonstrate their authority and prove to the customer that it's the best option.
- Action – The final stage of the sales funnel is action. This is the point at which the prospective customer completes the process by becoming an active customer. It is possible to convert a one-time customer into a repeat customer as an additional stage to the action component. By giving the customer exactly what they want and more, you can keep them coming back and possibly raise awareness, attracting new prospects into the sales funnel.

The purchase funnel is also often referred to as the "customer funnel", "marketing funnel", "sales funnel", or "conversion funnel". The association of the funnel model with the AIDA concept was first proposed in Bond Salesmanship by William W. Townsend in 1924.

This early model has been modified by marketing consultants and academics to cater to the modern customer and is now referred to in marketing as the "purchase funnel" or "buying funnel". Many different business-to-consumer purchase models exist in marketing today, but it is generally accepted that the modern business-to-business purchase funnel has more stages, considers repurchase intent, and takes into account new technologies and changes in consumer purchase behavior. As a model, the buying funnel has been validated in a variety of domains, including searching, keyword advertising, and lead generation, , but also modified to include previously unconsidered steps and metrics such as outbound sales and internet impressions.

The purchase funnel concept is used in marketing to guide promotional campaigns targeting different stages of the customer journey and as a basis for customer relationship management (CRM) programs and lead management campaigns.

== Conversion funnel ==
Similar to a purchase funnel, "conversion funnel" is a technical term used in e-commerce operations to describe the track a consumer takes through an Internet advertising or search system, navigating an e-commerce website and finally converting to a sale.

The main elements of an online purchase/sales funnel are:

- Traffic sources (i.e. SEO, PPC, referral traffic, etc.)
- Top of the funnel (TOFU) which coincides with the traditional awareness stage
- Middle of the funnel (MOFU) describing prospects in the consideration stage
- Bottom of the funnel (BOFU) corresponding to latter life-cycle stages (i.e. decision, conversion, purchase)
- Re-engagement paths – strategies and techniques meant to recover lost prospects/leads, usually through retargeting ads or email marketing

The modern conversion funnel can have many entrance points, meaning people can enter at any stage of their life-cycle, they can leave and enter again. An effective online marketing strategy requires an omnichannel approach that combines various traffic sources, campaigns and re-engagement paths to finalize the purchase.

== See also ==
- DAGMAR marketing
- Sales process
- Customer relationship management
- Customer lifecycle management
- Lead generation
