= Sub-niche market =

In marketing, a sub-niche market is a very small market niche having specific appeal. A sub-niche is a small group of individuals removed from the mainstream marketplace. A niche market may become so large that it may seem that it is part of a mainstream group when in actuality it is still a niche. It can then be divided into a smaller group of individuals within the niche itself.

== Etymology ==
The term "sub-niche" was first used by internet marketers to describe people or products in the market who are in very small niches. When used in business a sub-niche is targeted for selling products or services that are more suited for these individuals than the larger niche.

== Marketing for and in sub-niche markets ==
Sub-niche marketing is the process of finding niche markets where the individuals can be broken down into smaller subsets of the niche itself. Usually this occurs in larger niche markets where the niche may no longer be targeted enough to satisfy the entire population of that niche. While the product and/or services provided by that particular niche serve to fulfill a need it may not do so to the highest degree. In this case a sub-niche would serve this purpose.

== Online sub-niche marketing ==
This technique is often used by affiliate marketers. The sub-niche is a more profitable group based in the internet market as opposed to a tangible marketplace because of the specificity required in targeting such a market. Online business has little start up cost and can afford and even target multiple sub-niche markets to create a steady form of revenue. The technique of sub-niche marketing is duplicated in multiple markets to achieve the desired amount of income.
