= Aspirational age =

In advertising and marketing, aspirational age is an ideal age whose characteristics consumers aspire to embody. Thus, marketing messages aimed at that target age will resonate with consumers of other ages.

The aspirational age in Western society is the cusp between childhood and adulthood. In theory, consumers younger than this age aspire to the maturity and freedom it signifies, while those older than it seek to recapture the youthfulness and freedom from responsibility of this age. Thus, products pitched at notional young adults will appeal to a broader target market.

== Ideology ==
The aspirational age can be identified as the age of which consumers associate positive experiences with, such as freedom. For example, most adults are preoccupied with day-to-day responsibilities which can be viewed as stressful. Marketing to the aspirational age therefore, allows businesses to attract a generation of nostalgic consumers. The aspirational age as a tool is thus essentially modelled on the notion of nostalgia. From the adult's perspective, the psychology behind the 'aspirational age' can be defined as a recapture of youthful days. 'High-speed modern living, stress and the impact of recession' have all been considered as factors which influence a consumer's longing of their 'aspirational age'.

== Evidence ==
The aspirational age relies on a youth-obsessed culture, which is particularly associated with the Western World, specifically America. Crux Research states that the aspirational age in the form of adverts targeted to kids, essentially works as 'adults aspire backwards'. Thus utilising this emotional link allows marketers, if effective, to target a wider audience.

A study of 'Age Related Vicarious Nostalgia and Aesthetic Consumption' from the University of Wolverhampton concluded age as a phenomenon which is not 'totally bound to chronological time constraints'. In this sense, nostalgia 'has a bearing on the cognitive age of the individual', making it useful for businesses to market towards the aspiration age, in an attempt to trigger a pleasant cognitive response. The Harvard Business Review article on a study conducted by the Grenoble School of Management, states that 'nostalgic feelings increased people's willingness to pay for desired objects'. The article concludes that the psychology behind the aspirational age is 'useful to brands looking to elicit feelings of nostalgia in their promotions' . The article uses Subaru's 2012 'First Car Story' as an example, although the car does not target 16-year-olds, the campaign allows adults to create their own first car story through animation. The desired result, as the study suggests, is that when consumers think nostalgically, they spend more money.

== Examples ==
Examples of real-life businesses who appear to market towards the aspirational age include Urban Outfitters and Pepsi. An article by The Business Journals identifies how using technology, businesses market their products to the aspirational age. The aspirational age then becomes a tool for product development alongside marketing. The article cites Urban Outfitters' nostalgic marketing of introducing old famous brands i.e. Lisa Frank, Nickelodeon's '90 Are All That' time slots and Pepsi's 'Pepsi Throwback' as example of businesses which market towards the aspirational age. Thus the aspirational age as a tool, targets the particular age whilst simultaneously allowing the older generation to reflect on products or services they once loved.

== Differences ==
=== Generational differences ===
Differences between generations would however mean that marketing to the 'aspirational age' today might not necessarily attract older consumers, as their experiences of being younger would differ greatly. Social changes and technological advancements would have influenced different experiences thus different aspirations.

- Generation Y; (1981-1996) Generation Y is defined as a product of 'Baby Boomers', accustomed to the onset of media and the genesis of the Internet. Generation Y is categorised by 'choice customisation, scrutiny, integrity, speed and entertainment'.
- Generation Z; (1997-2012) Generation Z is characterised by the onset of 'Tweendom'. Teenagers within this generation today recognised by the need for 'instant gratification, success as a given and liberal social values'. Thus the product of a Generation Y youth would be more accustomed to 'cyber speak' (certainly within the Western world). Since one quarter of 8-18 year olds spend their time using social media, the aspirational age can be difficult to estimate. The success of the aspirational age as a marketing tool is dependable on the success of how adaptable the latter generation is towards the target audience.

=== Industries ===
==== Music ====
Businesses can market to the aspirational age, yet this would vary depending on the industry. For example, music labels can build brand development according to their own 'aspirational ages'. Labels can identify the age of 32 as an aspirational age for example. How Music Builds Value identifies the 32-year-old lifestyle as a time which can 'supersede the elements of mass-market life'. The case study cites that the label (Smashburger) can create an 'aspirational experience' by targeting 32-year-olds due to being a 'magical age'.

==== Food ====
Differences within a particular industry can also occur in terms of appropriate aspirational ages. An Integrated Approach to New Food Product Development recognises the aspirational age as '1–3 years older than the calendar age of the child'. This would depend on the product and who the manufacturer aims to target. If the business desires a wider target audience, the target age should be 'acceptable to the youngest age in the target'. The article recognises the aspirational age as the 'safe' choice as consumers would not 'reject a product that has a simpler flavour profile'.

=== Cultural differences ===
The aspirational age of the Western world would differ greatly. For example, to assume the aspired age (if accepted as within adolescence) would correspond universally could be stereotypical. Heavily influenced by societal laws such as marriageable age or legal drinking for example, differences in experiences would thus lead to different idealised aspirational ages between cultures.

== Issues ==
=== Stereotypes ===
A report by Age UK recognised advertising aimed at the aspirational age rather than the biological age as 'stereotypical'. A study conducted by Age UK, led by Sandra Chalmers found that elderly people felt that their generation were 'completely ignored'. Thus under-representation of older consumers due to marketing towards an aspirational age can be risky. Ann Murray Chatterton examined 52 commercials to find 35% included someone who was above the age of 50, and 12% including someone above the age of 65 years. Consequently, older consumers are less represented in an attempt to capture the target audience.

== Effectiveness and future use of the aspirational age ==
=== Product development ===
The article Nostalgia: A Neuropsychiatric Understanding even suggests that product development using smell can induce 'nostalgic recall' and is thus an important 'marketing tool'. In this sense, the aspirational age can be embedded as a factor within product development.

=== Reversals ===
Reversals of the aspirational age would differ as the child's aspirational age has risen 'whilst the adults has fallen'. Children at Play: An American History assessed the relationship between products and age within America to conclude that 'marketers who once sought to sell toys to fourteen year olds have lowered their age target to ten'. The aspirational age will continue to adapt as societal changes occur.

"An eleven year old no longer asks for a stuffed animal or a fire truck and instead desires a Madden NFL football game, a cell phone, an iPod, or a Beyonce Knowles CD, while a thirty-five-year-old may also indulge by buying a Madden football game, a cell phone, an iPod, or a Beyonce Knowles CD".

== See also ==
- Youth marketing
