= Base point pricing =

Base point pricing is the system of firms setting prices of their goods based on a base cost plus transportation costs to a given market. Although some consider this a form of collusion between the selling firms (it lowers the ability of buying firms to gain a competitive advantage by location or private transportation), it is common practice in the steel and automotive industries. It allows firms to collude by simply agreeing on a base price.

== Overview ==
Base point pricing is a pricing method used in the bond market. It refers to the practice of quoting bond prices in terms of a base point value, which is equal to 1/100 of 1% or 0.01%. For example, a bond with a price of 100 base points would have a price of 1%.

Base point pricing is used as a standard unit of measurement in the bond market, as it allows for more precise and easier comparison of bond prices. It is also used to calculate the yield on a bond, which is the rate of return that an investor can expect to earn on a bond over a given period of time.

Base point pricing is not to be confused with basis point, which refers to a unit of measurement used in finance.

== Types ==
1. Point Pricing (-5 to +5 range)
2. Rebate Pricing (-5 to +5 range)
3. Bond Pricing (+95 to +105 range)

A pricing approach that involves designating a particular geographic location as a basing point and then charging customers as a freight cost from that location to the location of the customer. Or a pricing method in which customers are charged freight cost from a base point; the base point may be chosen arbitrarily, but the location of one of the company's manufacturing plant is commonly used.

== See also ==
- Competition policy
