= Market share analysis =

Market share analysis is a part of market analysis and indicates how well a firm is doing in the marketplace compared to its competitors.

Givon, Mahajan, and Muller have researched spreadsheet and word processing software firms to give a clearer image of how to determine market share in the software industry. They propose six factors to help estimate the value of market share (1997):

- unit or dollar sales,
- user base (since piracy and brand switching effect),
- market definition (scope of definitions),
- scope of denominator (which other brands included),
- time frame length,
- product definition (brand, product line, or strategic business unit).

== Detail ==
A market share analysis needs to take into account the following:

Total Market Size refers to the annual business volume in currency or in number of transactions;

Market Growth Rate refers to the Compound Annual Growth Rate|Compounded Annualized Growth Rate (CAGR) taken over a period of 3 to 5 years;

Market Share is the breakup of market size in percentage terms, to help identify the top players, the middle and the "minnows" of the marketplace, based on the volume of business conducted;

Market Segmentation Some of the factors that determine the market are price, quality, speed of service, ease of maintenance, and points of distribution. By mapping on quality and price parameters, it is possible to identify graphically the spaces which are crowded by service providers and which are the relatively empty spots;

Key Players i.e.the top players in each segment of the market. The extent to which they provide premium quality, or premium service or price advantage, can help identify future target segments;

Swot Analysis. The strengths of players as well as weaknesses/areas of improvement are needed to combat the onslaught in a marketing warfare. Strength and weakness include brand equity, geographic presence, strong management/leadership, technological edge, and patent/copyrights.

Emerging Opportunities should be identified which could make the market grow faster/larger or acquire business more easily. Similarly, are there threat factors that could reduce the total market size. These could be due to regulatory guidelines, changes in fashion trends, consumer preference, macro economic events like currency crisis, import/export, war, natural calamity, or demographic shift;

Business Continuity Plan: While planning for market share analysis, the worse must be planned for to ensure continuity of the concern in the event of a calamity. Companies which have a continuity plan usually sustain shocks better and ensure achievement of targeted market share.

Target Market Share: Based on the above analysis, it is possible to arrive at the overall market size for the assessment period, and thereby decide on the volume of business the firm targets to achieve during the period. This helps determine the firm's targeted market share. This also helps budget for activities like budgeting for R&D, sales promotion, marketing, and training.

== Bibliography ==
- Givon, M. Mahajan, V. and Muller, E. (1997). "Assessing the Relationship between the User-Based Market Share and Unit Sales-Based Market Share for Pirated Software Brands in Competitive Markets". Technological Forecasting and Social Change. 55 (2): 131–144. doi:10.1016/S0040-1625(96)00181-3.
