= Media context studies (Advertising research) =

Field of advertising research

Media context studies refers to the group of studies investigating “how and which media context variables influence the effects of the advertisements embedded in the context“. Media researchers found that media context affects ad recall, ad recognition, level and nature of ad processing, ad attitude and ad cognitions, brand attitude, and purchase intention.

Media context would influence media users’ attitude toward ads in several ways. First, the similarity in the mood of the media context and the ads would enhance learning and evaluations of the ad and its message. Goldberg and Gorn (1987) call this the mood congruency-accessibility hypothesis: The ad context makes a certain mood or affect more accessible and relieves the processing of stimuli with similar moods or affects. Second, the prestige of the media source would rub off on the brand and influence the perceptions of the advertised brand. Fuchs (1964) found support for this hypothesis and he called it the congruity principle: the medium and the advertised brand converge and become more similar in consumers’ minds. Third, the media context can serve as a cognitive prime that guides the attention and determines the users’ interpretation of the ads. For instance, a print ad promoting a large car may be interpreted as safe when the context is an editorial article about safety, or as fuel-thirsty when the context is an editorial article about oil. Forth, the nature of the medium itself may moderate the editorial content’s influence on acceptance of the ads. For example, ads in print media can be skipped more easily compared to ads on radio and television, so the appreciation of the magazine editorial may lead to less ad processing than on radio and television.

While the influence of media context on embedded ads undoubtedly exists and is important, it is complicated and difficult to evaluate. The related theories may be conflicting in this regard. For example, the Feelings-as-information Theory suggested that people in a positive mood tend to avoid stimuli such as ads. If people acquire a good mood as a result of processing media content, they may avoid paying attention to ads embedded in this context and process them less intensively. However, the Hedonic Contingency view stated that people in a positive mood may engage in greater processing of a stimulus because they believe that the consequences are going to be favorable. Given the complexity of the issue, a framework of media context effect on advertising response is demanded. One such endeavor is conceptualizing media engagement as an antecedent of the attitude toward the embedded advertisements.

This approach attempts to connect U&G perspective to studies media context effects on users’ attitude toward ads. Researchers conceptualized different attributes of individual media users as media engagement and posited that it serves as an antecedent of the attitude toward the embedded advertisements. Initially, scholars used the term experience to refer to these influential factors when relating to how media use would influence advertisement acceptance. Experience was described as “an emotional, intuitive perception that people have while using the media” (p. 84). Calder and Malthouse (2009) defined media experience as “the thoughts and feelings consumers have about what is happening when they are doing something” in or with media (p. 257). For example, users have a utilitarian experience when they believe a website provides information that facilitates their decision making. They have an intrinsically enjoyable experience when other content enables them to escape from the pressures of daily life. Calder and Malthouse (2009) described experience as consisting of two dimensions: the hedonic value associated with the experience and the motivational component, which is posited as engagement. Hence, the engagement is conceptualized as “the sum of the motivational experiences consumers have with the media product” (p. 259), which affects the strength of media experience. It influences people’s reaction to advertisements because the strong motivational experiences consumers have with a media vehicle would make an ad potentially part of something that consumers are trying to make happen in their life.

Scholars have tested the relationship between media engagement and advertising effectiveness and suggested that all things being equal, if consumers engaging with a media vehicle have strong motivational experiences, an ad potentially becomes more effective on this medium as well. Based on this argument Calder and Malthouse (2006) proposed a media congruency hypothesis and tested it empirically with magazine ads, with positive results. With the emergence of the Internet, Calder, Malthouse and Schaedel (2009) tested it in Website context and also got supportive results. The experiment yielded a positive correlation between Web users’ engagement with Websites and reaction toward an Orbitz (an online travel agency) ad. This study showed both overall engagement and personal and social interactive engagement affected reaction to ads, while social interactive engagement was more uniquely attributed to online media having an independent effect on ad reaction.
