= Movement marketing =

Movement marketing, or cultural movement marketing, is a marketing model that begins with an idea on the rise in culture. The Cultural Movement agency, StrawberryFrog, invented the movement marketing model in 1999 working for Smart Car and IKEA.

“Movements” as a new brand-building marketing model begins with an idea on the rise in culture rather than the product itself.

== Definition ==
Cultural movements is a marketing model that builds brands by identifying, sparking, organizing, leading and/or aligning with an idea on the rise in culture and building a multi-platform communications around this idea so the advocates can belong, rally, engage, and bring about change.

"Cultural movement" requires a radical rethink of the old rules of marketing.

- Instead of being about “the individual” it is about the group
- Instead of being about persuading people to believe something, it is about understanding & tapping into what they already believe
- Instead of being about selling, it is about sharing
- Perhaps most radical of all, it requires advertisers to stop talking about themselves – and to join in a conversation that is about anything and everything but the product

StrawberryFrog defines the cultural movement model as having five phases:

1. Strategy
2. Declaration
3. Provocation
4. Go MASSive
5. Sustainability
