= Smarketing =

Integrated sales and marketing

Smarketing is the process of integrating the sales and marketing processes of a business. The objective is for the sales and marketing functions to have a common, integrated approach.

Smarketing aims to promote the product or service to potential buyers and at the same time integrate this process with the sales department's activities. Sales and marketing departments should meet frequently and agree on a common terminology, and using data throughout the entire sales and marketing process to identify good prospects and to follow up on how well they are followed up. Smarketing works best when a firm does closed loop reporting by tracking its success with particular prospects from the marketing stage through direct sales efforts. According to one source, Smarketing began around 2000 as a result of improved web browsing capabilities.

== See also ==
- Marketing
- Sales
