= Online panel =

Group of online research participants

An online panel (formerly called a discontinuous access panel) is a group of selected research participants who have agreed to provide information at specified intervals over an extended period of time.

== History and terminology ==
Online panels are a form of access panel. The ISO standard ISO 20252 defines it as "a sample database of potential respondents who declare that they will cooperate for future data collection if selected". Panel members are typically recruited through an agency campaign, often with some kind of incentive, or appealing to those who simply wish to share their opinion. Online panel data (OPD) is widely used in market research. Other fields that contain prominent usage of online panel data include psychological, social, and medical research, as well as electoral studies.

Online panels were first utilized in academic journals in the late 1990s, though similar ideas had been proposed in the 1980s. Usage has steadily increased since this time, with one analysis putting their prevalence at 14.3% of their dataset of the empirical articles published in 2017. They were formerly called discontinuous access panels; the usage of the word "panel" in this context is a non-standard meaning relative to its typical survey usage (which aim to measure the same variables using the same group of people at different times).

== Types ==
There are several types of online panels:

- General population panels, which can include hundreds of thousands of participants and are typically used for studies of the general population
- Specialty panels, in which the participants are selected due to a specific commonality they share, like owning a specific product or being a member of a specific demographic
- Proprietary panels, a sub-type of specialty panels focused on specific companies, also called client panels or insight communities
- Census balanced samples, panels designed to reflect the population's demographic proportions
- Election panels, panels of those eligible to vote in political elections before and after elections

An example is the German Internet Panel, which studies the economic and political attitudes of its participants. This panel is unusual in its inclusion of people who previously had little internet access. Another is Amazon's MTurk, which includes as one of the tasks assigned to its crowdsourced workers OP participation.

== Advantages and concerns ==
Online panels are a useful way to keep costs down but to also reach a high number of people, which makes them ideal for either pilot studies or scale development. They are also used to solve a sample frame problem in surveys where e-mails would otherwise be used, where there is no otherwise complete e-mail list of the target study population. The speed of data collection and sampling efficiency are also common reasons for their usage.

While popular, their usage has attracted criticism. Data quality issues are a concern with online panels, including "panel conditioning" of the respondents. Many studies are also ambiguous and do not clearly report if they used panel data. There are also ethical concerns due to the usage of incentives in attracting the respondents, and the fact that though many OP respondents are paid workers many studies do not report their pay, or if paid far under the minimum wage.

One problem with online panels is that they are not well suited for evaluating services that are offline alternatives, as the users of these services would be unlikely to be selected for an online panel. One analysis found that an online panel was biased in a way that reflected Internet demographics, with women, the elderly, and the uneducated being less represented in the sample; the analysis found that this sample was biased and statistical weighting could not overcome the issue.

== See also ==
- Computer-assisted telephone interviewing
- Computer-assisted personal interviewing
- Questionnaire construction
- Paid survey
