= List of abbreviations for market segments =

Some market segments are referred to by acronyms and initials:

== List of abbreviations for market segments ==
=== Customer segments ===
- DINKY – Double income no kids
- SOHO – Small office, home office
- VSB – Very small business
- SMB – Small medium business / SME – Small and medium enterprise
- VALS – Values attitude and life-styles
- LOHAS – Lifestyles of health and sustainability
- LOVOS – Lifestyle of voluntary simplicity
- OINKY - One income no kids yet
- SAM – Segmented addressable market
- VLE – Very large enterprise
- Kippers – Kids in parents' pockets eroding retirement savings

=== Market/product segments ===
- BPO – Business process outsourcing
- Comms – Communications sector
- DIY – Do It yourself market
- FMCG – Fast-moving consumer goods
- FSS – Financial services sector
- HoReCa – Hotel, restaurant, café
- H&LS – Health and life sciences
- ICT – Information & communication technology
- RPO – Recruitment process outsourcing
- ECS - Engineering and Construction Services
