= Social Marketing Quarterly =

- Discipline: Social marketing
- Language: English
- Edited by: Sameer Deshpande, Jude McDivitt, Tina Robinette

Publication details
- History: 1994-present
- Publisher: SAGE Publications
- Frequency: Quarterly

Standard abbreviations
- ISO 4: Soc. Mark. Q.

Indexing
- ISSN: 1524-5004
- LCCN: 00211002
- OCLC no.: 34306234

Links
- Journal homepage; Online access; Online archive

Social Marketing Quarterly is a quarterly peer-reviewed academic journal covering social marketing. The editors are Sameer Deshpande and Jude McDivitt. The Managing Editor is Tina Robinette. It was established in 1994 and is published by SAGE Publications in association with FHI360.

== Abstracting and indexing ==
The journal is abstracted and indexed in:

- CAB Abstracts
- Business Source Complete
- SocINDEX
- PsycINFO
- Scopus
