= Import parity price =

Import parity price or IPP is defined as, “The price that a purchaser pays or can expect to pay for imported goods; thus the c.i.f. import price plus tariff plus transport cost to the purchaser's location. This and the export parity price together define a range of the possible equilibrium prices for equivalent domestically produced goods”.

A simpler definition is used by the UN World Food Programme: “The import parity price (IPP) is the price at the border of a good that is imported, which includes international transport costs and tariffs”.

The USAID Market and Trade Glossary definition is: "Import parity price (IPP) – is the monetary value of a unit of product bought from a foreign country, valued at a geographic location of interest in the importing country".
