= Export parity price =

Export Parity Price (EPP) is defined as, "The price that a producer gets or can expect to get for its product if exported, equal to the Freight on Board price minus the costs of getting the product from the farm or factory to the border. This and the import parity price together define a range of the possible equilibrium prices for an equivalent domestically produced good".

Where a country or a region in a country has a surplus of a product that is exported, the EPP is determined by considering the Import Parity Price or International Benchmark Price of the commodity and other trade factors. The EPP applies only to the quantity that is exported and not to the quantity that is sold domestically.
