= International Journal of Bank Marketing =

- Discipline: Financial services, marketing
- Language: English
- Edited by: Hooman Estelami

Publication details
- History: 1983-present
- Publisher: Emerald Group Publishing
- Frequency: 7/year

Standard abbreviations
- ISO 4: Int. J. Bank Mark.

Indexing
- ISSN: 0265-2323

Links
- Journal homepage

The International Journal of Bank Marketing is a peer-reviewed academic journal in the field of financial services marketing. It was established in 1983 by MCB University Press (now Emerald Group Publishing).

The journal has an Impact Factor of 7.3 and is ranked as an A journal by the Australian Business Deans Council (ABDC).
