= Customer lifecycle management =

Business practice

Customer lifecycle management (CLM) is the measurement of multiple customer-related metrics, which, when analyzed over time, indicate business performance. The overall scope of CLM implementation encompasses all domains or departments of an organization, generally integrating all sources of static and dynamic data, marketing processes, and value-added services into a unified decision-support platform through iterative phases of customer acquisition, retention, cross- and upselling, and lapsed customer win-back.

Modern approaches also integrate AI-powered personalization, omnichannel engagement, and predictive analytics to improve customer retention and lifetime value.

Some detailed CLM models further break down these phases into acquisition, introduction to products, profiling of customers, growth of customer base, cultivation of loyalty among customers, and termination of customer relationship.

Any customer lifecycle management program would need to use a customer relationship management system (CRM).

According to a DM Review magazine article by Claudia Imhoff, et al., "The purpose of the customer life cycle is to define and communicate the stages through which a customer progresses when considering, purchasing and using products, and the associated business processes a company uses to move the customer through the customer life cycle."

== See also ==
- Customer relationship management
- ECRM
- Purchase funnel
