= Consumer value =

Subjective evaluation of a product

Consumer value is used to describe a consumer's strong relative preference for certain subjectively evaluated product or service attributes.

The construct of consumer value has widely been considered to play a significant role in the success, competitive advantage and long-term success of a business, and is the basis of all marketing activities. Research has shown that the most important factor of repurchase intentions is consumer value, where value stems from positive consumer shopping experiences from retailers.

The emergence of consumer value research began in the 1980s, with the 1990s and 2000s being a time of clear growth and a generation of key insights for marketing academics. The definition of consumer value has long remained unclear due to the nature of the construct, its characteristics and its conceptualisation.

There are various definitions of consumer value in literature, however, an overall recurring theme is that consumer value is a trade-off between a consumer's 'benefits and sacrifices' when making a consumption choice. In academic literature, researchers have widely considered Morris Holbrook's definition of value as a core element of a consumer's consumption experience, to be a pioneer in consumer value research. Holbrook's typology of values include efficiency, excellence, status, esteem, play, aesthetics, ethics and spirituality. Valerie Zeithaml's value conceptualisation as an individual's assessment of a product's utility based on what they have given and what they have received, has also been used by multiple researchers since.

Consumer value literature has seen more multi-dimensional approaches than one-dimensional approaches, however researchers agree that two dimensions can be distinguished from them, where one is functional in nature, and the other is emotional in nature. Researchers have developed their own scales and approaches to the consumer value conceptualisation, in which as many as eight dimensions have been seen in literature.

== Origins ==
The origins of research, the interest and the attention to the consumer value construct can be traced back to the 1980s. During the 1990s and 2000s, the conceptualisation and measurement of the construct expanded rapidly in the field of management, organisation and marketing literatures. Many insights, questions and contributions joined the current complexity of understanding consumer value. In the past decade, researchers have attempted to review the existing literature surrounding consumer value by studying the construct in merely business contexts, while most studied consumer contexts. Since the 2000s, more recent studies have moved away from approaching the construct as a concept, but rather, a measurement, which explores the relationships between value and other variables.

== Definitions ==
Despite consumer value being regarded as a core marketing concept, researchers have widely agreed on the inconsistency of its definition, its nature, its characteristics and its conceptualisation. The definition of consumer value has been identified to differ based on the perspective and the context. Consumer value conceptualisation has been considered "broad as it is extensive and is represented as much in the field of economics and philosophy as it is in the domain of business". Despite different expressions, however, a commonality between these definitions is that consumer value is the gains and losses perceived by a consumer, in which these include price, utility, quality, benefits and costs.

Table 1 outlines the differing definitions of consumer value by various academic researchers over time.

Table 1. Different definitions of Consumer value
Author(s)	Definition
Holbrook and Corfman	The characterisation of an individual's experience based on their interaction with a specific object, thing, or event.
Holbrook	Value is the outcome of an individual's overall consumption experience.
Zeithaml	'Value is price' and 'value is what I get for what I give'. A consumer perceives value as what they have received (i.e., an assessment of the overall utility of a product) and what they have given for the product (e.g., price).
Sheth, Newman and Gross	A consumer makes a choice based on various consumption values, including functional, social, emotional, epistemic and conditional value. These consumption values are independent and each value acts as different contributions in any situation a consumer must make a choice.
Babin, Darden and Griffen	Value is related to hedonic responses and other more tangible consequences.
Maklan and Knox	Value is the difference between a consumer's perception of having or using a product or a service, and the total costs of its purchase.
Woodruff	Value is what a consumer prefers and the act of evaluating the product's attributes, performance and consequences, and whether they successfully fulfil the customer's goals and purposes in situations they require them.
Day; Lai	Value is the difference between a consumer's perceived benefits and cost.

== Notable studies ==
=== Holbrook's Typology of Consumer value ===
Among the numerous studies surrounding consumer value, Holbrook's was considered to be a pioneer of the value construct as he defined it to be a core element of a consumer's consumption experience. His approach was consistently refined over two decades, fundamentally leading to his development of a typology of value. This typology has been noted as "the most comprehensive approach to the value construct, because it captures more potential sources of value than do other conceptualisations". The value conceptualisations that Holbrook identified included economic, social, hedonic, and altruistic, in which these were further separated into eight value types: efficiency, excellence, status, esteem, play, aesthetics, ethics, and spirituality. These value types were considered either self-oriented (i.e. to be primarily concerned with oneself) or other-oriented (i.e. taking into account the feelings and needs of others).

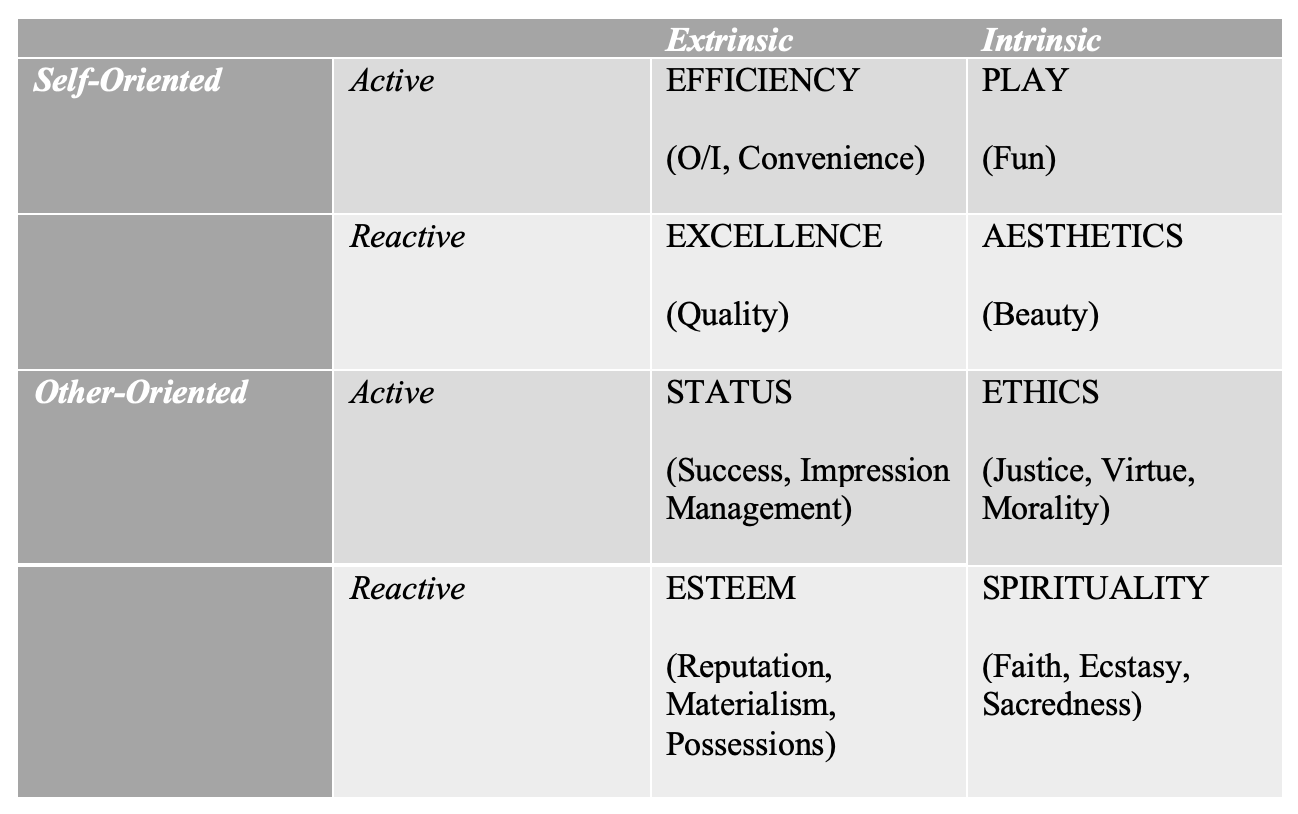
An overview of Holbrook's Typology of Consumer Value.

==== Efficiency ====
Efficiency is the result of an individual actively using a product or consuming an experience to accomplish some kind of purpose. Efficiency is often measured as “a ratio of outputs to inputs.” An example of this is the efficiency of a car, where an appropriate ratio is the distance the car can travel against the amount of fuel it uses. Efficiency can also be measured as convenience, such as how much use can be derived from a product or service versus the time or energy used to source them.

==== Excellence ====
Excellence refers to an individual's admiration or appreciation of an object due to its quality, its ability to achieve a goal or to carry out a particular function. For example, a Ferrari may be a good choice for a high-quality car, however, it would not be a good choice for a delivery truck.

==== Status ====
Status refers to an individual's consumption of a product or an experience to communicate a particular type of image or to convey an impression that portrays success.

==== Esteem ====
Status and esteem play hand in hand with one another, with esteem seen as a reaction to status. Esteem is the enhancement of one's reputation and their public image through the ownership of certain possessions.

==== Play ====
Play is the consumption of a product or an experience purely for one's own enjoyment and typically involves having fun. It is actively sought by individuals and it is a self-oriented experience.

==== Aesthetics ====
Aesthetics is also a self-oriented value; it refers to the intrinsic appreciation of a consumption experience, and the enjoyment of it for one's own sake without needing any external justification.

==== Ethics ====
Ethics is a self-oriented value and involves performing an act for others' sake, taking into account how it may affect them or their reaction to it. For example, individuals donating blood do not do it for their own selfish gains – they are often motivated by selflessness instead.

==== Spirituality ====
Spirituality is an "intrinsically motivated acceptance, adoption, appreciation, admiration, or adoration of an “Other" where this "Other" may constitute some Divine Power, or some otherwise inaccessible Inner Being." An example of this is people donating money to churches to feel closer to an "Other."

=== Zeithaml's Consumer Perceptions of Price, Quality and Value ===
Another study on consumer value that has been widely accepted by researchers was the works of Zeithaml in 1988, where four common uses of value were identified:

1. 'Value is price'
2. 'What I get for what I give' – value is the trade-off between benefits and costs
3. Value is the trade-off between the price of a product and its perceived quality
4. Value is the qualitative, quantitative, objective and subjective elements of a customer's overall exchange experience

Zeithaml defines perceived value as the overall customer experience, and as the compromise between either benefits and sacrifices or between quality and sacrifices, in which the sacrifices can be split into financial and psychological.

Zeithaml's cost-benefit ratio-oriented definition has since popularised and influenced many researchers to study the conceptualisation of consumer value as a "get-versus-give" trade-off.

== Dimensions of consumer value research ==
Despite the occasional use of a one-dimensional approach to consumer value research, most academics approached their studies by including multiple dimensions to capture the numerous characteristics of product consumption. Researchers have widely agreed on two distinguishable dimensions from literature. The first is functional in nature, while the other is emotional or affective in nature.

Researchers such as Holbrook, Lapierre; Pura; Sanchez, Callarisa, Rodriguez and Moliner followed a multi-dimensional approach. Some researchers including Holbrook and Corfman and Hirschman and Holbrook studied consumer value through approaches like social, socio-psychological and experiential. Several additional dimensions in literature emerged thereafter. Consumer value research has seen as many as eight dimensions; for example, Gallarza and Saura's 2006 study.

As inspired by Zeithaml, another popular approach in consumer value literature was the division of the concept as two measures, with the first being benefits (economic, social and relational), and the second being consumers' sacrifices (price, time, effort, risks and opportunities). Other researchers also identified a dimension known as 'transaction value', which focused more on the psychological satisfaction or pleasure that consumers would receive from an attractive price deal.

A further example of a multi-dimensional approach to consumer value was Sheth's 1991 identification of five dimensions to the concept, including functional, social, emotional, epistemic and conditional. More specifically, functional values were defined as the consumer's perception of the functional and utilitarian attributes or benefits of a product or service, such as its performance, price and efficiency. Social values entailed how consumers perceived their product or service in terms of its association with distinctive social groups. Emotional values detailed the consumer's feelings, affect or mood about their consumption experience. Epistemic values were about consumers needing novelty, satisfying curiosity and an eagerness for knowledge. Conditional values consisted of the perceived utility gained from a product or a service in relation to situational or contextual factors, such as using sunscreen lotion during summer when going outside.

In a following study conducted in 2001, Sweeney and Soutar reduced Sheth's original five dimensions into three. These included functional value, social value and emotional value, in which they were then later elaborated into a scale known as the PERVAL scale. The PERVAL scale consisted of 19 items which were used in retail purchase environments to determine the specific consumption values that drove consumer purchase attitudes and behaviours. Petrick adapted Sweeney and Soutar's 2002 study with the creation of the SERV-RERVAL scale, which consisted of quality, monetary price, behavioural price, emotional and reputation. Also following Sweeney and Soutar, researchers Sanchez, Callarisa, Rodriguez and Moliner developed a post-purchase perceived value scale called GLOVAL in 2006, which was designed specifically for the tourism industry. The GLOVAL scale composed of six dimensions, where four of them related to the dimensions of functional value and the last two related to social and emotional value.

Table 2 outlines the differing dimensions of consumer value by various academic researchers over time.

Table 2. Different dimensions of Consumer value
Author(s)	Dimensions
Holbrook and Corfman	Hedonic value, utilitarian value
Monroe and Chapman	Acquisition value, transaction value
Sheth, Newman and Gross	Functional, emotional, conditional, social, epistemic
Nilson	Tangibles values, intangibles values
Babin, Darden and Griffin	Hedonic value, utilitarian value
Litten, Kotler and Fox	Expected value, received value
Lovelock	Pre-use value, post-used value
Zeithaml, Berry and Parasuraman	Benefits (quality, satisfaction and specific benefits), costs (money, time and effort)
Woodruff	Emotional or intrinsic value, functional or extrinsic value, logical or value for money
Grönroos	Functional value, emotional value
Grewal, Monroe and Krishnan	Quality, price, acquisition, transaction
Holbrook	Efficiency, excellence, play, aesthetics, status, esteem, ethics, spirituality
Oliver	Consumption value, extended value
Parasuraman and Grewal	Acquisition value, transaction value, value "in-use", redemption value
Sweeney and Soutar	Functional – quality, functional – price, emotional, special (PERVAL)
Petrick	Quality, monetary price, behavioural price, emotional, reputation (SERVQUAL)
Mathwick, Malhotra and Rigdon	Active values (efficiency; economic value and enjoyment); Reactive values (visual attraction; entertainment value and service excellence)
Sanchez, Callarisa, Rodriguez and Moliner	Functional value, emotional value, social value (GLOVAL)
Lee, Yoon and Lee	Functional value, emotional value, overall value
Wu and Liang	Experiential value (hedonic consumption paradigm): Consumer return on investment, Excellent service, Aesthetics

== See also ==
- Consumer
- Consumerism
- Consumer behaviour
- Marketing
- Marketing research
- Marketing strategy
- SERVQUAL
- Service quality
- Value
- Value proposition
- Value (marketing)
