= Service quality =

Comparison of expectation with performance

Service quality (SQ), in its contemporary conceptualisation, is a comparison of perceived expectations (E) of a service with perceived performance (P), giving rise to the equation SQ = P − E. This conceptualisation of service quality has its origins in the expectancy-disconfirmation paradigm.

A business with high service quality will meet or exceed customer expectations whilst remaining economically competitive. Evidence from empirical studies suggests that improved service quality increases profitability and long term economic competitiveness. Improvements to service quality may be achieved by improving operational processes; identifying problems quickly and systematically; establishing valid and reliable service performance measures and measuring customer satisfaction and other performance outcomes.

== Definition ==
From the viewpoint of business administration, service quality is an achievement in customer service. It reflects at each service encounter. Customers form service expectations from past experiences, word of mouth and marketing communications. In general, customers compare perceived service with expected service, and if the former falls short of the latter the customers are disappointed.

For example, in the case of Taj Hotels Resorts and Palaces, wherein TAJ remaining the old world, luxury brand in the five-star category, the umbrella branding was diluting the image of the TAJ brand because although the different hotels such as Vivanta by Taj- the four star category, Gateway in the three star category and Ginger the two star economy brand, were positioned and categorised differently, customers still expected high quality of Taj.

The measurement of subjective aspects of customer service depends on the conformity of the expected benefit with the perceived result. This in turns depends upon the customer's expectation in terms of service, they might receive and the service provider's ability and talent to present this expected service. Successful companies add benefits to their offering that not only satisfy the customers but also surprise and delight them. Delighting customers is a matter of exceeding their expectations.

Pre-defined objective criteria may be unattainable in practice, in which case, the best possible achievable result becomes the ideal. The objective ideal may still be poor, in subjective terms.

Service quality can be related to service potential (for example, worker's qualifications); service process (for example, the quickness of service) and service result (customer satisfaction).

Individual service quality states the service quality of employees as distinct from the quality that the customers perceived.

== Evolution of service quality concept ==
Historically, scholars have treated service quality as very difficult to define and measure, due to the inherent intangible nature of services, which are often experienced subjectively.

One of the earliest attempts to grapple with the service quality concept came from the so-called Nordic School. In this approach, service quality was seen as having two basic dimensions:

Technical quality: What the customer receives as a result of interactions with the service firm (e.g. a meal in a restaurant, a bed in a hotel)
Functional quality: How the customer receives the service; the expressive nature of the service delivery (e.g. courtesy, attentiveness, promptness)

The technical quality is relatively objective and therefore easy to measure. However, difficulties arise when trying to evaluate functional quality.

== Dimensions of service quality ==
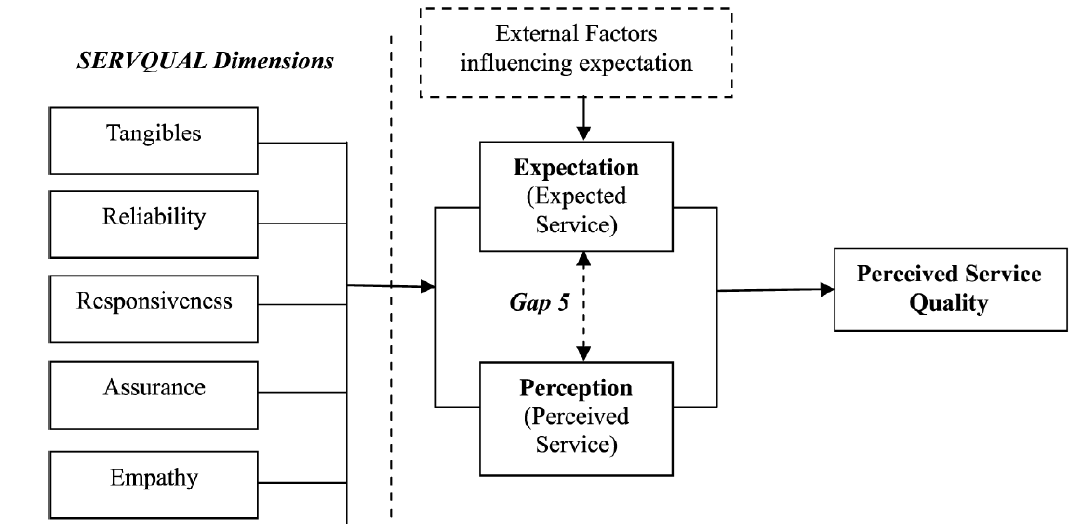
The five dimensions of service quality

A customer's expectation of a particular service is determined by factors such as recommendations, personal needs and past experiences. The expected service and the perceived service sometimes may not be equal, thus leaving a gap. The service quality model or the 'GAP model' developed in 1985, highlights the main requirements for delivering high service quality. It identifies five 'gaps' that cause unsuccessful delivery. Customers generally have a tendency to compare the service they 'experience' with the service they 'expect'. If the experience does not match the expectation, there arises a gap. Given the emphasis on expectations, this approach to measuring service quality is known as the expectancy-disconfirmation paradigm and is the dominant model in the consumer behaviour and marketing literature.

A model of service quality, based on the expectancy-disconformation paradigm, and developed by A. Parasuraman, Valarie A. Zeithaml and Len Berry, identifies the principal dimensions (or components) of service quality and proposes a scale for measuring service quality, known as SERVQUAL. The model's developers originally identified ten dimensions of service quality that influence customer's perceptions of service quality. However, after extensive testing and retesting, some of the dimensions were found to be autocorrelated and the total number of dimensions was reduced to five, namely - reliability, assurance, tangibles, empathy and responsiveness. These five dimensions are thought to represent the dimensions of service quality across a range of industries and settings. Among students of marketing, the mnemonic, RATER, an acronym formed from the first letter of each of the five dimensions, is often used as an aid to recall.

In spite of the dominance of the expectancy-disconfirmation paradigm, scholars have questioned its validity. In particular scholars have pointed out the expectancy-disconfirmation approach had its roots in consumer research and was fundamentally concerned with measuring customer satisfaction rather than service quality. In other words, questions surround the face validity of the model and whether service quality can be conceptualised as a gap.

== Measuring service quality ==
Measuring service quality may involve both subjective and objective processes. In both cases, it is often some aspect of customer satisfaction which is being assessed. However, customer satisfaction is an indirect measure of service quality. Research has also indicated that the presence of service quality leads to several outcomes including changes in perceived value, customer satisfaction and loyalty intentions with consumers.

== E-service quality: The next frontier ==
Given the widespread use of internet and e-commerce, researchers have also sought to define and measure e-service quality. Parasuraman, Zeithaml, and Malhotra (2005, p. 5) define e-service quality as the "extent to which a website facilitates efficient and effective shopping, purchasing, and delivery." Wolfinbarger and Gilly (2003, p. 183) define e-service quality as "the beginning to the end of the transaction including information search, website navigation, order, customer service interactions, delivery, and satisfaction with the ordered product.".

A recent paper examined research on e-service quality. The author identified four dimensions of e-service quality: website design, fulfillment, customer service, and security and privacy.

=== Measuring subjective elements of service quality ===
Subjective processes can be assessed in characteristics (assessed be the SERVQUAL method); in incidents (assessed in critical incident theory) and in problems (assessed by Frequenz Relevanz Analyse a German term. The most important and most used method with which to measure subjective elements of service quality is the Servqual method.

=== Measuring objective elements of service quality ===
Objective processes may be subdivided into primary processes and secondary processes. During primary processes, silent customers create test episodes of service or the service episodes of normal customers are observed. In secondary processes, quantifiable factors such as numbers of customer complaints or numbers of returned goods are analysed in order to make inferences about service quality.

== Approaches to the improvement of service quality ==
In general, an improvement in service design and delivery helps achieve higher levels of service quality. For example, in service design, changes can be brought about in the design of service products and facilities. On the other hand, in service delivery, changes can be brought about in the service delivery processes, the environment in which the service delivery takes place and improvements in the interaction processes between customers and service providers.

Various techniques can be used to make changes such as: Quality function deployment (QFD); failsafing; moving the line of visibility and the line of accessibility; and blueprinting.

== Approaches to improve the conformity of service quality ==
In order to ensure and increase the 'conformance quality' of services, that is, service delivery happening as designed, various methods are available. Some of these include guaranteeing; mystery shopping; recovering; setting standards and measuring; statistical process control and Customer involvement management.

== Service quality and customer satisfaction ==
The relationship between service quality and customer satisfaction has received considerable attention in academic literature. The results of most research studies have indicated that the service quality and customer satisfaction are indeed independent but are closely related that and a rise in one is likely to result in an increase in another construct.

== See also ==
- ISO 9001
- Quality Management
- Customer focus
- Services marketing
- Mystery shopping
