= Valarie Zeithaml =

Marketing professor

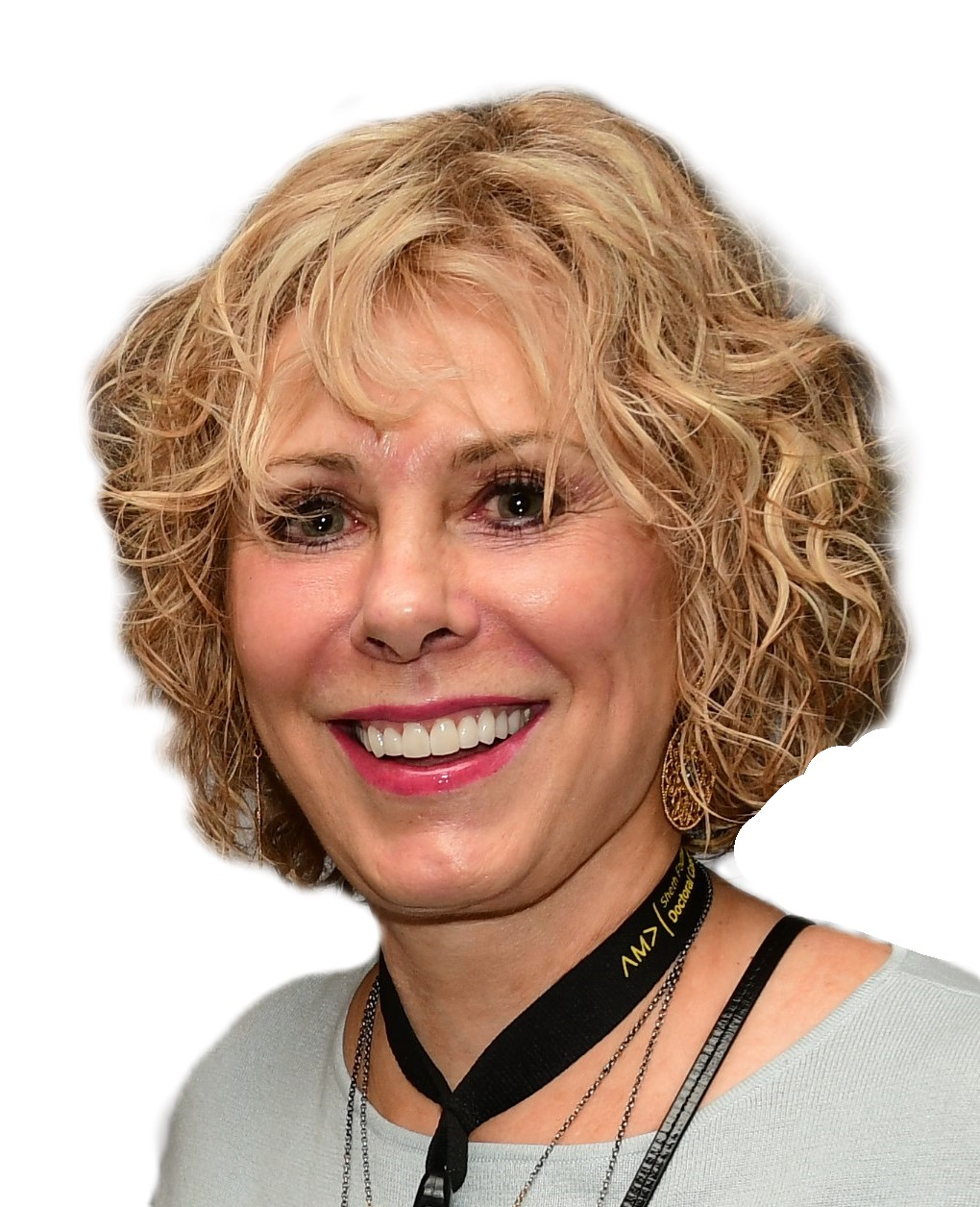
- Title: Distinguished Professor of Marketing Emerita

Academic work
- Discipline: Marketing
- Sub-discipline: Services marketing, Service quality, Value
- Institutions: UNC Kenan–Flagler Business School, University of North Carolina at Chapel Hill
- Notable works: Delivering Quality Service; Services Marketing (8th ed.); Gaps Model of Service Quality; SERVQUAL

Valarie A. Zeithaml is a marketing scholar and author. She is Distinguished Professor of Marketing Emerita at Kenan-Flagler Business School, University of North Carolina at Chapel Hill. Zeithaml is known for her work in services marketing and service quality, including co-development of the Gaps Model of Service Quality and the SERVQUAL measurement scale. Her published work has been cited more than 330,000 times on Google Scholar (h-index 89 as of September 2026).

== Early life and education ==
Zeithaml earned a Bachelor of Arts degree from Gettysburg College. She later received both a Master of Business Administration and a Doctor of Philosophy degree from the University of Maryland.

== Career ==
In the 1980s, Zeithaml and her co-authors developed SERVQUAL, a multidimensional scale for measuring perceived service quality. She was named a Thomson Reuters Highly Cited Researcher in the report on “The World’s Most Influential Scientific Minds.”

At the University of North Carolina’s Kenan-Flagler Business School, Zeithaml held several administrative positions, including Associate Dean of the MBA Program, Senior Associate Dean for Academic Affairs, and Chair of the Marketing Area. She previously held the David S. Van Pelt Family Distinguished Professor of Marketing title and is now Distinguished Professor of Marketing Emerita. She also served as an Academic Trustee of the Marketing Science Institute and as Chair of the Board of the American Marketing Association.

Notably, Zeithaml served in various capacities within the American Marketing Association, including Treasurer in 2015, Incoming Chairman of the Board in 2016, Chairman of the Board in 2017, and Outgoing Chairman of the Board in 2018. She served as a Center for Services Leadership Fellow at Arizona State University from 2016 to 2017. Additionally, from 2001 to 2007, Zeithaml served as an Academic Trustee of the Marketing Science Institute, one of only 12 worldwide.

== Research ==
With A. Parasuraman and Leonard L. Berry, Zeithaml co-developed the Gaps Model of Service Quality (1985), a conceptual framework that identifies gaps between customer expectations and perceptions of service. The model provides the foundation for the SERVQUAL scale. Zeithaml’s development of the SERVQUAL model is a widely adopted measurement instrument across various industries and countries.

Her 1996 paper “The Behavioral Consequences of Service Quality” has been cited more than 24,000 times. According to Google Scholar her work has received more than 330,000 citations (h-index 89 as of September 2026).

Her books, including Delivering Quality Service: Balancing Customer Perceptions and Expectations and Services Marketing: Integrating Customer Focus Across the Firm (now in its eighth edition, co-authored with Mary Jo Bitner, Dwayne D. Gremler, and Martin Mende), have contributed to the literature on marketing and customer relations.

== Selected publications ==
=== Books ===
- Zeithaml, V.A., Parasuraman, A., & Berry, L.L. (1990). Delivering Quality Service: Balancing Customer Perceptions and Expectations. Free Press / Simon & Schuster.
- Zeithaml, V.A., Bitner, M.J., Gremler, D.D., & Mende, M. Services Marketing: Integrating Customer Focus Across the Firm (8th edition). McGraw-Hill.
- Roland Rust, Valarie A. Zeithaml and Kay Lemon (2000). Driving Customer Equity: Focusing Strategic Decisions for Long-term Profitability. Free Press.
- Valarie Zeithaml and A. Parasuraman, Service Quality, Marketing Science Institute.

=== Publications ===
- Parasuraman, A.; Zeithaml, V.A.; Berry, L.L. (1985). “A Conceptual Model of Service Quality and Its Implications for Future Research.” Journal of Marketing, 49(4), 41–50.
- Parasuraman, A.; Zeithaml, V.A.; Berry, L.L. (1988). “SERVQUAL: A Multiple-Item Scale for Measuring Consumer Perceptions of Service Quality.” Journal of Retailing, 64(1), 12–40.
- Zeithaml, V.A.; Berry, L.L.; Parasuraman, A. (1996). “The Behavioral Consequences of Service Quality.” Journal of Marketing, 60(2), 31–46.
- Zeithaml, V.A. (1988). “Consumer Perceptions of Price, Quality, and Value: A Means-End Model and Synthesis of Evidence.” Journal of Marketing, 52(3), 2–22. doi:10.2307/1251446
- Rust, R.T.; Lemon, K.N.; Zeithaml, V.A. (2004). “Return on Marketing: Using Customer Equity to Focus Marketing Strategy.” Journal of Marketing, 68(1), 109–127. doi:10.1509/jmkg.68.1.109.24030
- Valarie A. Zeithaml, Bernard J. Jaworski, Ajay K. Kohli, Kapil R. Tuli, Wolfgang Ulaga, and Gerald Zaltman (2020), “A Theories-in-Use Approach to Building Marketing Theory,” Journal of Marketing, September. doi:10.1177/0022242919888477
- Valarie A. Zeithaml, Katrien Verleye, Isabella Hatak, Monika Koller, and Alexander Zauner (2020), “Three Decades of Customer Value Research: Paradigmatic Roots and Future Research Avenues,” Journal of Service Research, November. doi:10.1177/1094670520948134

== Awards and recognition ==
- 2024 Award from the Association of Consumer Research for the paper that made the highest contribution to behavioral research for “Behavioral Consequences of Service Quality.”
- Honorary Doctorate from BI Norwegian Business School in connection with its 75th anniversary.
- Named Marketing Legend by the American Marketing Association 2016
- AMA Irwin/McGraw-Hill Distinguished Marketing Educator Award (2009)
- Paul D. Converse Award from the American Marketing Association (2008)
- Society for Marketing Science (with MSI and ISBM) – one of the 20 most influential articles of the past 25 years (2007)
- Best Article Award Sponsored by the Journal of Service Research and IBM for “E-S-QUAL” (2005)
- Holsten Award for Exceptional Service at the Kenan-Flagler Business School (2004)
- Marketing Educator of the Year Award, Academy of Marketing Science (2004)
- Innovative Contributor to Marketing Award, Marketing Management Association (2004)
- American Marketing Association Berry Prize for Driving Customer Equity (2003)
- Choice Magazine’s List of Outstanding Academic Books for Delivering Quality Service (1991)
- Harold H. Maynard Award, Journal of Marketing (1989)
- Appointed an American Marketing Association Lifetime Fellow
- 2012 Bullard Research Impact Award
- 2009 Sheth Foundation/Journal of Marketing Award for “Return on Marketing”
