= A. Parasuraman =

Indian-American business professor

A. "Parsu" Parasuraman
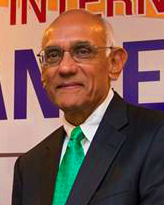
- Parasuraman in 2017
- Occupations: marketing professor, author.
- Years active: 1976–present
- Known for: Professor and the James W. McLamore Chair in Marketing at the University of Miami

A. "Parsu" Parasuraman is an Indian-American marketing scholar and author. He is the James W. McLamore Chair in Marketing at the University of Miami.

== Biography ==
Parasuraman obtained his bachelor's degree in mechanical engineering from IIT Madras in 1970 and a Master of Business Administration in marketing from the Indian Institute of Management Ahmedabad in 1972. He subsequently moved to the United States, where he received a doctorate in business Administration from the Indiana University School of Business in 1975.

Parasuraman was one of the co-authors of the classic study on Services marketing, which developed the concept of SERVQUAL. Parasuraman currently serves as the Pro-Chancellor (Academics) at Vijaybhoomi University, near Mumbai.
