= Industrialization of services business model =

The industrialization of services business model is a business model used in strategic management and services marketing that treats service provision as an industrial process, subject to industrial optimization procedures. It originated in the early 1970s, at a time when various quality control techniques were being successfully implemented on production assembly lines.

Theodore Levitt (1972) argued that the reason the service sector suffered from inefficiency and wide variations in quality were that it was based on the craft model. Each service encounter was treated as an isolated event. He felt that service encounters could be systematized through planning, optimal processes, consistency, and capital intensive investments. This model was the foundation of the success of McDonald's and many other mass service providers in the 1970s, 1980s, and 1990s.

Unfortunately, the application of assembly line techniques to service provision had several undesirable consequences. Employees found working under these conditions disempowering, resulting in low morale, high staff turnover, and reduced service quality. One of the most difficult aspects of this model for employees to deal with was the "smile incentives". Employees were instructed to put a smile on their face during the service encounter. This manufacturing and commercialization of apparent happiness has been criticised by many commentators, particularly Mundie (1987). Also many customers prefer the "personal touch".

By the early 1990s most service providers turned their attention back to the human element and personalized their services. Employees were empowered to customize the service encounter to the individual characteristics of customers.

Subsequently, scholars developed the service-profit-chain concept to understand how employees and customers interact to create value.

== See also ==
- services marketing
- servitization of products business model
- list of marketing topics
- list of management topics
