= Services marketing =

Branch of marketing specialised in services

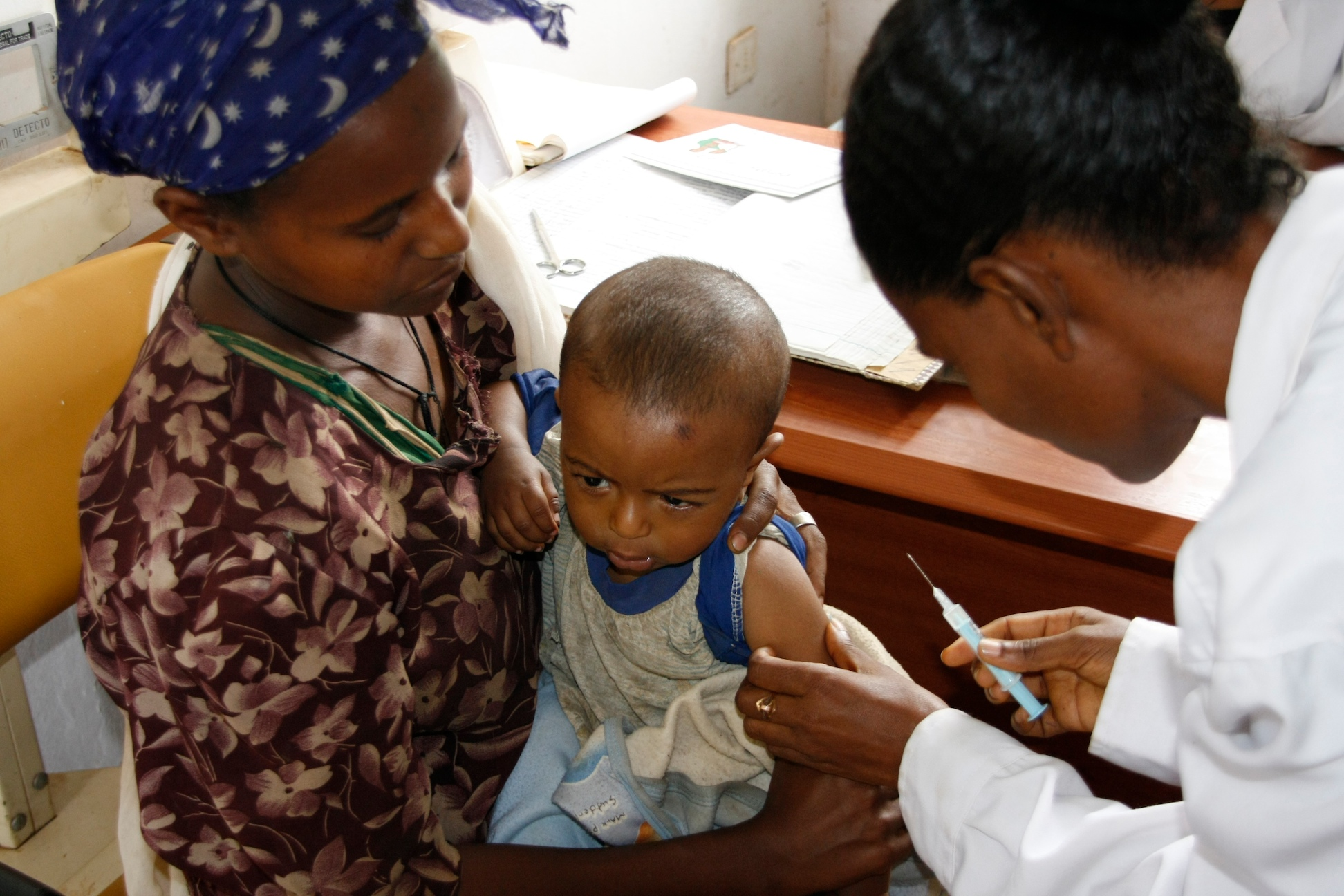
Services include a wide range of commercial and not-for-profit transactions including personal services, professional services, entertainment and leisure services.

Services marketing is a specialized branch of marketing which emerged as a separate field of study in the early 1980s, following the recognition that the unique characteristics of services required different strategies compared with the marketing of physical goods.

Services marketing typically refers to both business to consumer (B2C) and business-to-business (B2B) services, and includes the marketing of services such as telecommunications services, transportation and distribution services, all types of hospitality, tourism leisure and entertainment services, car rental services, health care services, professional services and trade services. Service marketers often use an expanded marketing mix which consists of the seven Ps: product, price, place, promotion, people, physical evidence and process. A contemporary approach, known as service-dominant logic, argues that the demarcation between products and services that persisted throughout the 20th century was artificial and has obscured the fact that everyone sells service. The S-D logic approach is changing the way that marketers understand value-creation and is changing concepts of the consumer's role in service delivery processes.

== Definitions ==
The American Marketing Association defines service marketing as an organizational function and a set of processes for identifying or creating, communicating, and delivering value to customers and for managing customer relationship in a way that benefit the organization and stake-holders. Services are (usually) intangible economic activities offered by one party to another. Often time-based, services performed bring about desired results to recipients, objects, or other assets for which purchasers have responsibility. In exchange for money, time, and effort, service customers expect value from access to goods, labor, professional skills, facilities, networks, and systems; but they do not normally take ownership of any of the physical elements involved.

A service encounter can be defined as the duration in which a customer interacts with a service. The customer's interactions with a service provider typically involve face-to-face contact with service personnel, in addition to interactions with the physical elements of the service environment including the facilities and equipment.

== Concepts of service ==
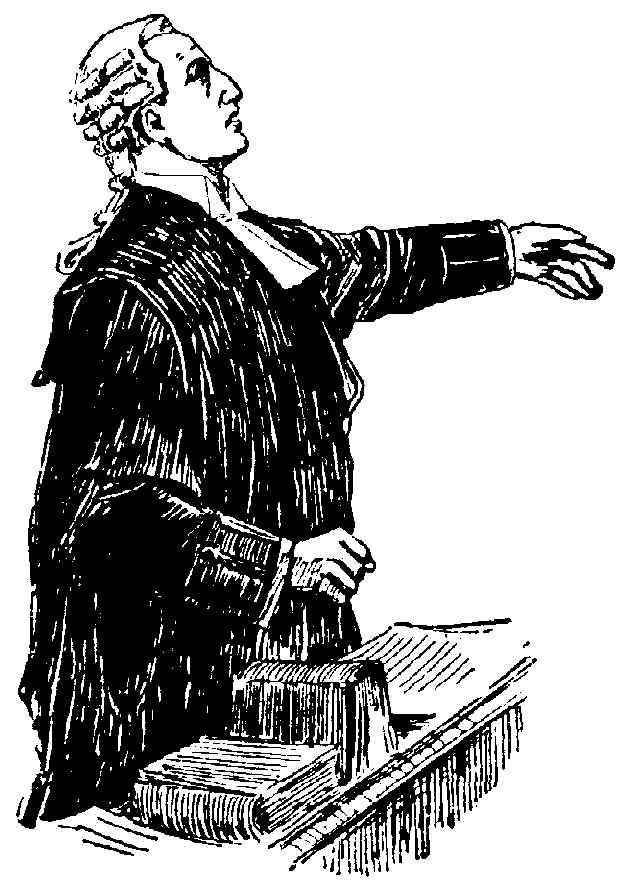
Classical economists believed that service work, no matter how honourable, was 'unproductive'.

Scholars have long debated the nature of services. Some of the earliest attempts to define services focused on what makes them different from goods. Late-eighteenth and early-nineteenth century definitions highlighted the nature of ownership and wealth creation. Classical economists contended that goods were objects of value over which ownership rights could be established and exchanged. Ownership implied possession of a tangible object that had been acquired through purchase, barter or gift from the producer or previous owner and was legally identifiable as the property of the current owner. In contrast, when services were purchased, no title to goods changed hands.

=== Historical perspectives ===
Adam Smith's seminal work, The Wealth of Nations (1776), distinguished between the outputs of what he termed "productive" and "unproductive" labor. The former, he stated, produced goods that could be stored after production and subsequently exchanged for money or other items of value. But unproductive labor, however "honourable, ...useful, or... necessary" created services that perished at the time of production and therefore didn't contribute to wealth.

French economist Jean-Baptiste Say argued that production and consumption were inseparable in services, coining the term "immaterial products" to describe them. In the 1920s, Alfred Marshall was still using the idea that services "are immaterial products."

In the mid nineteenth century John Stuart Mill wrote that services are "utilities not fixed or embodied in any object, but consisting of a mere service rendered ...without leaving a permanent acquisition."

=== Contemporary perspectives ===
When services marketing emerged as a separate sub-branch within the marketing discipline in the early 1980s, it was largely a protest against the dominance of prevailing product-centric view. In 1960, the US economy changed forever. In that year, for the first time in a major trading nation, more people were employed in the service sector than in manufacturing industries. Other developed nations soon followed by shifting to a service based economy. Scholars soon began to recognise that services were important in their own right, rather than as some residual category left over after goods were taken into account. This recognition triggered a change in the way services were defined. By the mid twentieth century, scholars began defining services in terms of their own unique characteristics, rather than by comparison with products. The following set of definitions shows how scholars were grappling with the distinctive aspects of service products and developing new definitions of service.

- "Goods are produced: services are performed." (Rathmell, 1966)
- "A service is an activity or a series of activities which take place in interactions with a contact person or a physical machine and which provides consumer satisfaction." (Lehtinen, 1983
- "The heart of the service product is the experience of the consumer which takes place in real time... it is the interactive process itself that creates the benefits desired by the consumer." (Bateson, 1992)
- "Services are deeds, processes and performances." (Zeithmal and Bitner, 1996)
- "Services are processes (economic activities) that provide time, place, form, problem-solving or experiential value to the recipient." (Lovelock, 2007)
- "The term 'service'... is synonymous with value. A supplier has a value proposition, but value actualization takes place during the customer's usage and consumption process." (Gummesson, 2008)

=== Alternative view ===
A recently proposed alternative view is that services involve a form of rental through which customers can obtain benefits. Customers are willing to pay for aspirational experiences and solutions that add value to their lifestyle. The term, rent, can be used as a general term to describe payment made for use of something or access to skills and expertise, facilities or networks (usually for a defined period of time), instead of buying it outright (which is not even possible in many instances).

There are five broad categories within the non-ownership framework

1. Rented goods services: These services enable customers to obtain the temporary right to use a physical good that they prefer not to own (e.g. boats, costumes)
2. Defined space and place rentals: These services obtain use of a defined portion of a larger space in a building, vehicle or other area which can be an end in its own right (e.g. storage container in a warehouse) or simply a means to an end (e.g. table in a restaurant, seat in an aircraft)
3. Labor and expertise rental: People are hired to perform work that customers either choose not to do for themselves (e.g. cleaning the house) or are unable to do due to the lack of expertise, tools and skills (e.g. car repairs, surgery)
4. Access to shared physical environments: These environments can be indoors or outdoors where customers rent the right to share the use of the environment (e.g. museums, theme parks, gyms, golf courses).
5. Access to and usage of systems and networks: Customers rent the right to participate in a specified network such as telecommunications, utilities, banking or insurance, with different fees for varying levels of access

== Characteristics ==
Throughout the 1980s and 1990s, the so-called unique characteristics of services dominated much of the literature.

The four most commonly cited characteristics of services are:

Intangibility – services lack physical form; they do not interact with any of our senses in a conventional way, they cannot be touched or held.
Implications of intangibility: Ownership cannot be transferred, value derives from consumption or experience, quality is difficult to evaluate prior to consumption or purchase.

Inseparability – production and consumption cannot be separated (compared with goods where production and consumption are entirely discrete processes)
Implications of inseparability: Services are typically high contact systems and are labour-intensive; fewer opportunities to transact business at arm's length, fewer opportunities to substitute capital for labour; subject to human error.

Perishability – service performances are ephemeral; unlike physical goods, services cannot be stored or inventoried.
Implications of perishability: Demand is subject to wide fluctuations, no inventory to serve as a buffer between supply and demand; unused capacity cannot be reserved; high opportunity cost of idle capacity.

Variability (also known as heterogeneity) – services involve processes delivered by service personnel and subject to human variation, customers often seek highly customized solutions, services are inherently variable in quality and substance.
Implications of variability: Service quality is difficult to manage; fewer opportunities to standardize service delivery.

The unique characteristics of services give rise to problems and challenges that are rarely paralleled in product marketing. Services are complex, multi-dimensional and multi-layered. Not only are there multiple benefits, but there are also a multiplicity of interactions between customers and organizations as well as between customers and other customers.

== Framework ==
=== Classification of goods and services ===
There are many ways to classify services. One classification considers who or what is being processed and identifies four classes of services: people processing (e.g. beauty services, child care, medical services); mental stimulus processing (e.g. education services, counselling services, life-coaching), possession processing (e.g. pet care, appliance repair, piano tuning) and information processing (e.g. financial services, data warehousing services). Another method used to classify services uses the degree of customer interaction in the service process and classifies services as high contact (e.g. hospitality, dental care, hairdressing) or low contact (e.g. telecommunications, utility services).

Both economists and marketers make extensive use of the Search → Experience → Credence (SEC) classification of goods and services. The classification scheme is based on the ease or difficulty of consumer evaluation activities and identifies three broad classes of goods.

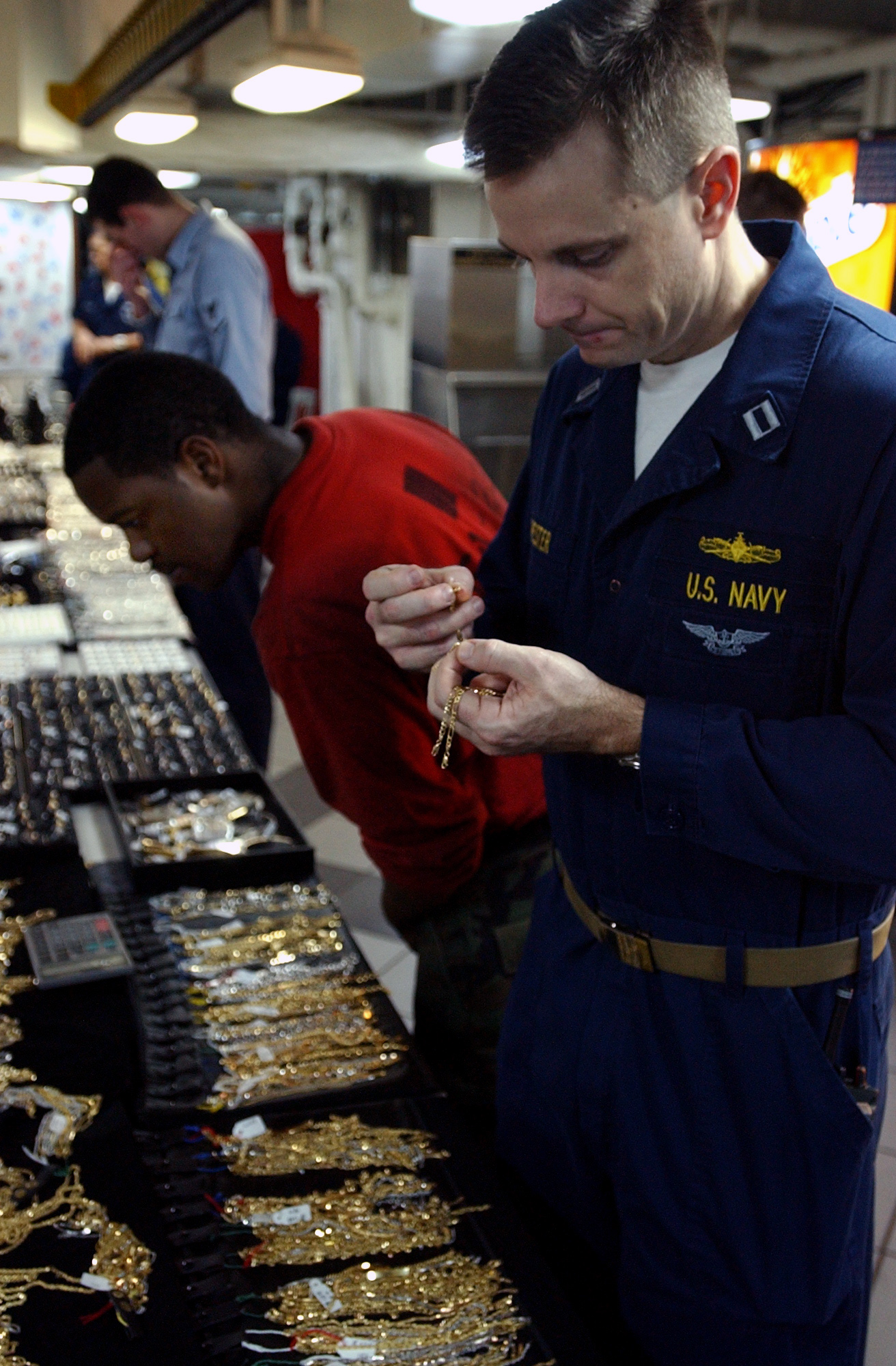
Search goods possess qualities that can be evaluated prior to consumption through direct inspection of the merchandise.

Search goods: are those which possess attributes that can evaluated prior to purchase or consumption. Consumers rely on prior experience, direct product inspection and other information search activities to locate information that assists in the evaluation process. Most products fall into the search goods category (e.g. clothing, office stationery, home furnishings).

Experience goods: are goods or services that can be accurately evaluated only after the product has been purchased and experiences. Many personal services fall into this category (e.g. restaurant, hairdresser, beauty salon, theme park, travel, holiday).

Credence claims: are goods or services that are difficult or impossible to evaluate even after consumption has occurred. Evaluation difficulties may arise because the consumer lacks the requisite knowledge or technical expertise to make a realistic evaluation or, alternatively because the cost of information-acquisition is prohibitive or outweighs the value of the information available. Many professional services fall into this category (e.g. accountant, legal services, medical diagnosis/treatment, cosmetic surgery). These goods are called credence products because the consumer's quality evaluations depend entirely on the trust given to the product manufacturer or service provider.

While some services may possess a number of search attributes (tangible dimensions), most services are high in experience or credence properties. Empirical studies have shown that consumers' perceived risk increases along the search-experience-credence continuum. The implication is that services tend to be high involvement decisions – where the consumer invests more heavily in information search activities during the purchase decision.

=== Risk perception and risk reduction in service purchase decisions ===
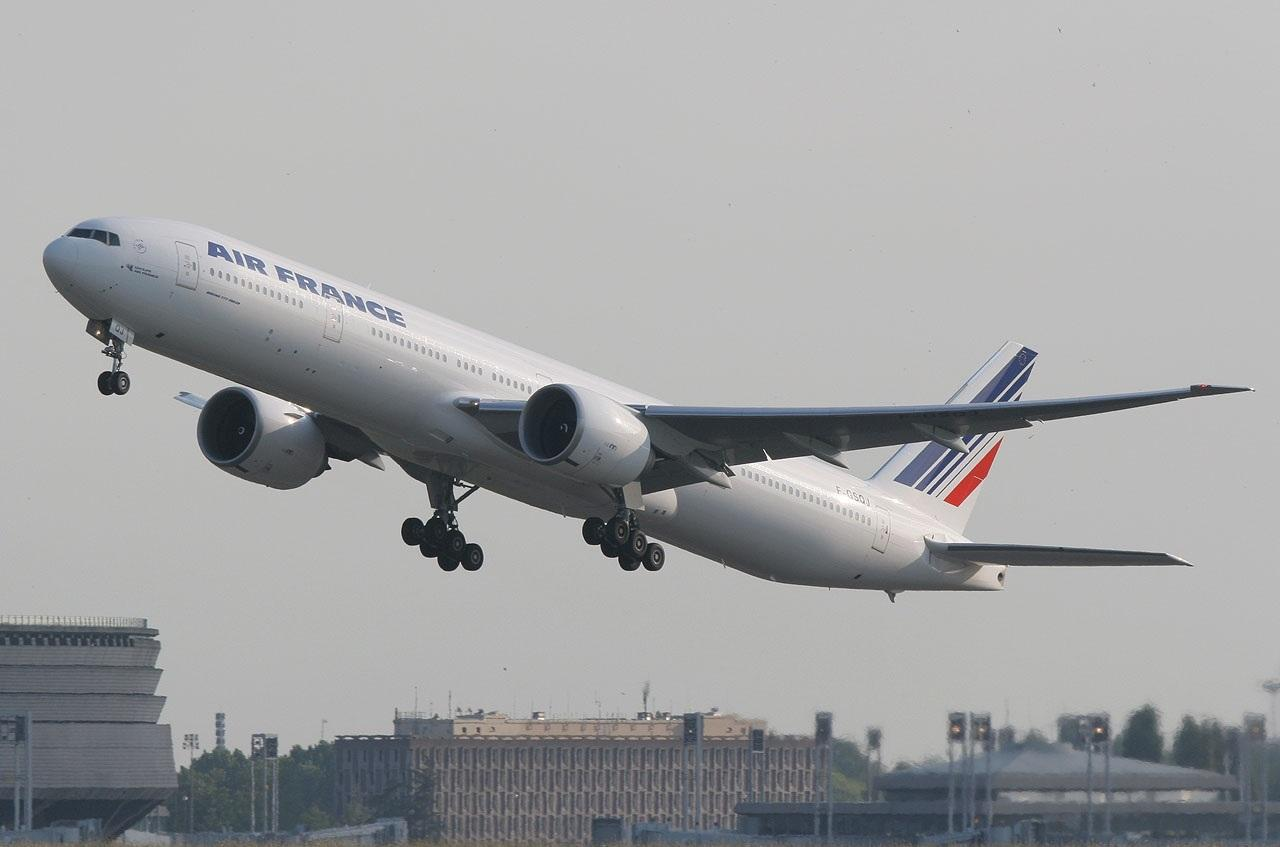
Consumers are often nervous about air travel. Although the risk of a negative outcome is low, the severity of consequences is high in the event of a service failure.

Perceived risk is associated with all purchasing decisions, both products and services alike. In terms of risk perception, marketers and economists argue that perceived purchase risk is higher for experience goods and credence goods with implications for consumer evaluation processes. Given that perceived risk drives the search for information in the pre-purchase stages of the consumer's decision process, consumers of services are more likely to engage in information acquisition activities as a means of ameliorating that risk. Any activity that a consumer undertakes in an effort to reduce perceived risk is known as a risk reduction activity.

Risk perception has been defined as "a perception or feeling "based on consumer's judgments of the likelihood of negative outcomes (uncertainty) and the degree of importance of these outcomes to the individual [consequences]". Thus, pre-purchase risk is a function of two dimensions, namely:

Uncertainty: the consumer's subjective assessment of the likelihood of occurrence
Consequence: the severity of the outcome for the individual in the event that a poor purchase decision is made

For example, consider the case of a prospective air traveler. Most of us know that the probability of being involved in an airline disaster is low (low uncertainty). It is conventional wisdom that travelers are safer in the air than on the roads. Statistically, you are much more likely to be involved in a vehicular accident than an aircraft disaster. While the likelihood of personal harm arising from air travel is indeed very low, the consequences of an airline disaster however are very serious indeed (high consequence). Whereas, car travelers who have been involved in a traffic accident often walk away with minor injuries, the same cannot be said for airline travelers. It is the severity of the consequence rather than the uncertainty that plays into airline passengers' fears. Consumers are constantly weighing up uncertainty and consequences to reach subjective evaluations of the overall risk attached to various purchase decisions.

Risk perception drives the information search process. Heightened risk perception may become a barrier to the natural progression of the purchase decision process and prevent customers from making a final brand choice. Consumers who are risk-averse tend to spend more time and effort engaged in information acquisition in the pre-purchase stage and look for specific types of information that will alleviate their perceptions of risk. Typical risk relievers might include such things as a reliance on personal sources of recommendation including word-of-mouth referrals; reliance on known and trusted brands, reading manufacturers' specifications, limited scale trial, reliance on warranties or guarantees etc.

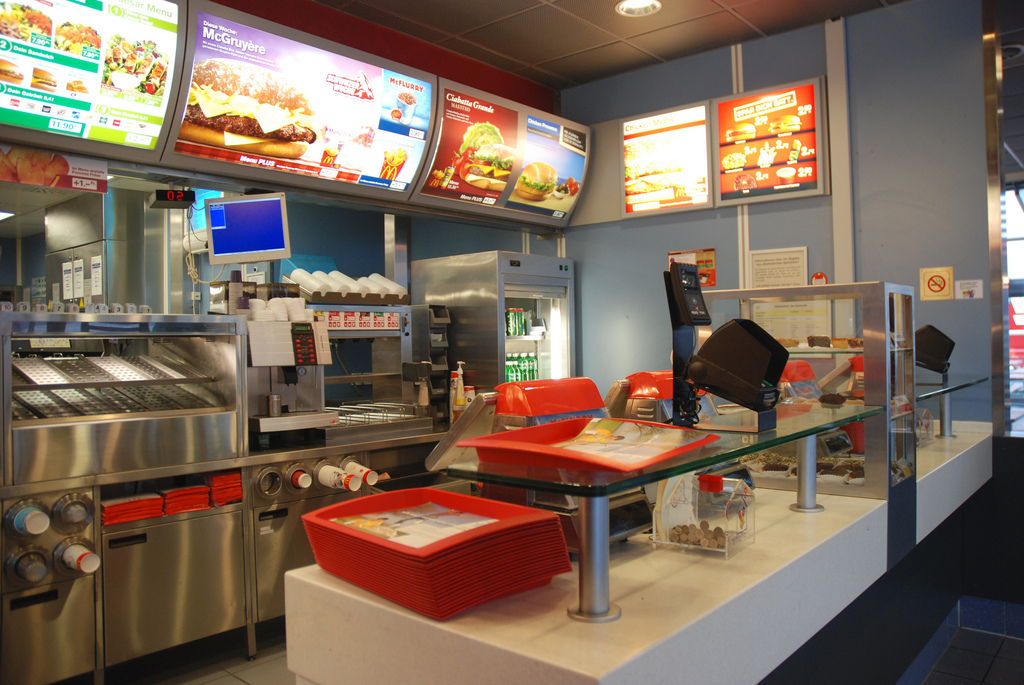
Standardisation, sometimes called the McDonald's approach, helps to reduce perceived risk because consumers can rely on a known product and quality.

Risk relievers that are especially relevant in service settings include:

High price maintenance: Some evidence suggests that risk-averse consumers often use high price as a guide to quality. Low prices may therefore be counter-productive since they suggest lower quality. Prestige pricing or premium pricing strategies are more likely to be indicated in service settings.

Limited scale trial: While some services cannot be fully trialled, marketers should think about limited scale trial or a virtual trial. e.g. use computer-aided design to visualize hairstyles, plastic surgery, Many virtual brand sites found online have successfully built of the notion of limited trial. Other examples include: test driving a software application.

Standardize the Product and Delivery: This is sometimes known as the McDonald's approach. Since variations in quality contribute to higher levels of perceived risk, one technique is to minimize variations by using production line techniques to control standards. This approach may be limited because many customers expect high levels of flexibility and customization as part of the process. Standardization needs to be fully communicated to customers – existing and potential – to be fully effective.

Purchase from a known or trusted brand: Consumers of services may be more predisposed to use a known, reputable brand as an indicator of quality merchandise. For this reason, service providers are presented with greater opportunities to engage in relationship marketing

=== Matching supply and demand ===
Service operations are often characterized by far more uncertainty with respect to the flow of demand. Service firms are often said to be capacity constrained. This refers to the finite carrying capacity for most service operators and the lack of inventory which serves as a buffer against unexpected or peak demand.

There are two components to capacity (i.e., supply) in service operations:

Number of employees: In medium and high contact systems, capacity is constrained by the number of contact staff available to provide service.

Size of service environment: Service environments have fixed space. A restaurant has a given number of tables, a hotel has a limited number of rooms, buses and trains are licensed to carry a specified number of passengers.

The factors contributing to uneven demand are more complex and difficult to predict. The components of demand may be seen as comprising long term demand patterns (trends), short term seasonal fluctuations and irregular effects.

Long-term demand patterns: Most industries exhibit underlying trends in demand over longer time frames. A trend is the long term direction in a time-series. Are sales growing, declining or stable? Often the trend in sales is related to the stage of the product life cycle. For example, industries in growth stages exhibit rapid increases in sales while industries in maturity may find that sales figures reach a plateau. Long-term demand patterns are stable and relatively easy to predict.

Seasonal Factors: Seasonal components are systematic, calendar-related movements in sales. Seasonal factors are recurring and relatively easy to predict. Seasonal factors might include peak and off peak seasons for a tourist resort. For a restaurant, however, peak seasons might coincide with main meal periods on a daily basis. Another seasonal factor is represented by holiday periods.

Irregular Fluctuations: Irregular fluctuations are unsystematic, short term fluctuations. Irregular effects are highly unpredictable. e.g. inclement weather closes an airport, forcing local hotels to accommodate thousands of guests with minimal advance warning; an unexpected thunder storm leads to a surge in demand for umbrellas.

When demand is low, capacity may be under-utilized while excess demand places enormous pressures on the service system. Service managers need to develop strategies for managing demand and supply under different conditions. Strategies for managing capacity involve careful consideration of both demand-side considerations and supply-side considerations.

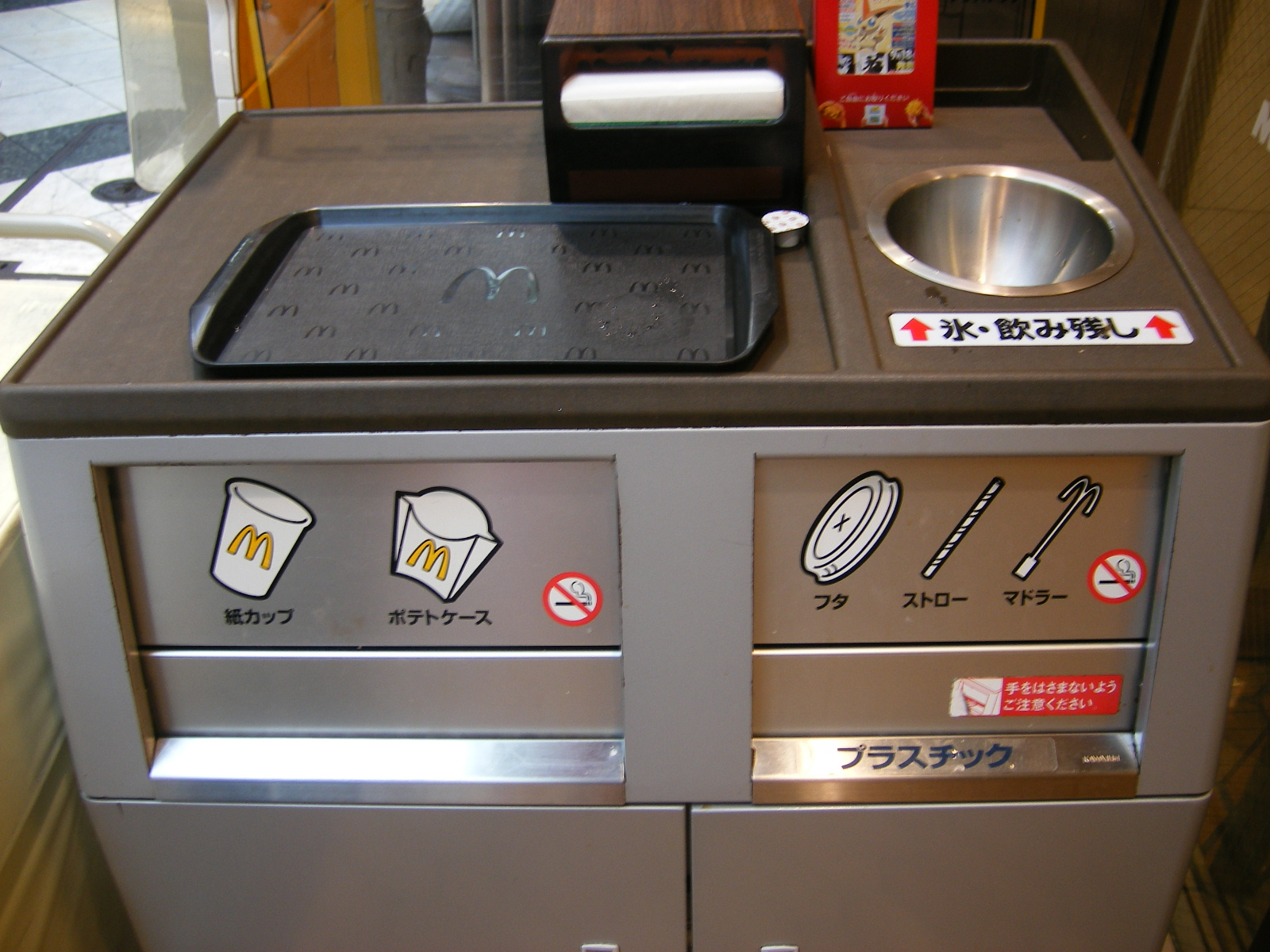
Using customers' labour to clean tables and dispose of rubbish, as in this McDonald's restaurant, reduces pressures on the operating system by freeing up employees to focus on core service activities.

On the capacity side:

Add to capacity – hire additional staff (e.g. casuals or temporary staff for peak periods); add to space (e.g. extra floor space in retail, hospitality or increased fleet size in transport services) Increasing capacity may require service re-design and presents a longer term solution to capacity problems.
Reconfigure interior space – with careful reconfiguration of interiors, it may be possible to accommodate a larger number of customers e.g. airline s to add to number of seats by reducing leg room.
Use Customers to Boost Productivity – Customers labour can be harnessed to reduce pressures on the system e.g. self-service, e-ticketing.
Transact business at arm's length – Use the internet or virtual delivery systems to transact business.
Ask Customers to use Third Parties – Where possible, have customers use agents or brokers to minimize the number of individual contacts and reduce pressure on the service system.
Share capacity – it may be possible to share capacity with other businesses e.g. airlines build strategic alliances with other operators so that excess demand can be booked or referred to a known ally (and does not involve passengers losing frequent flyer points).

On the demand side:

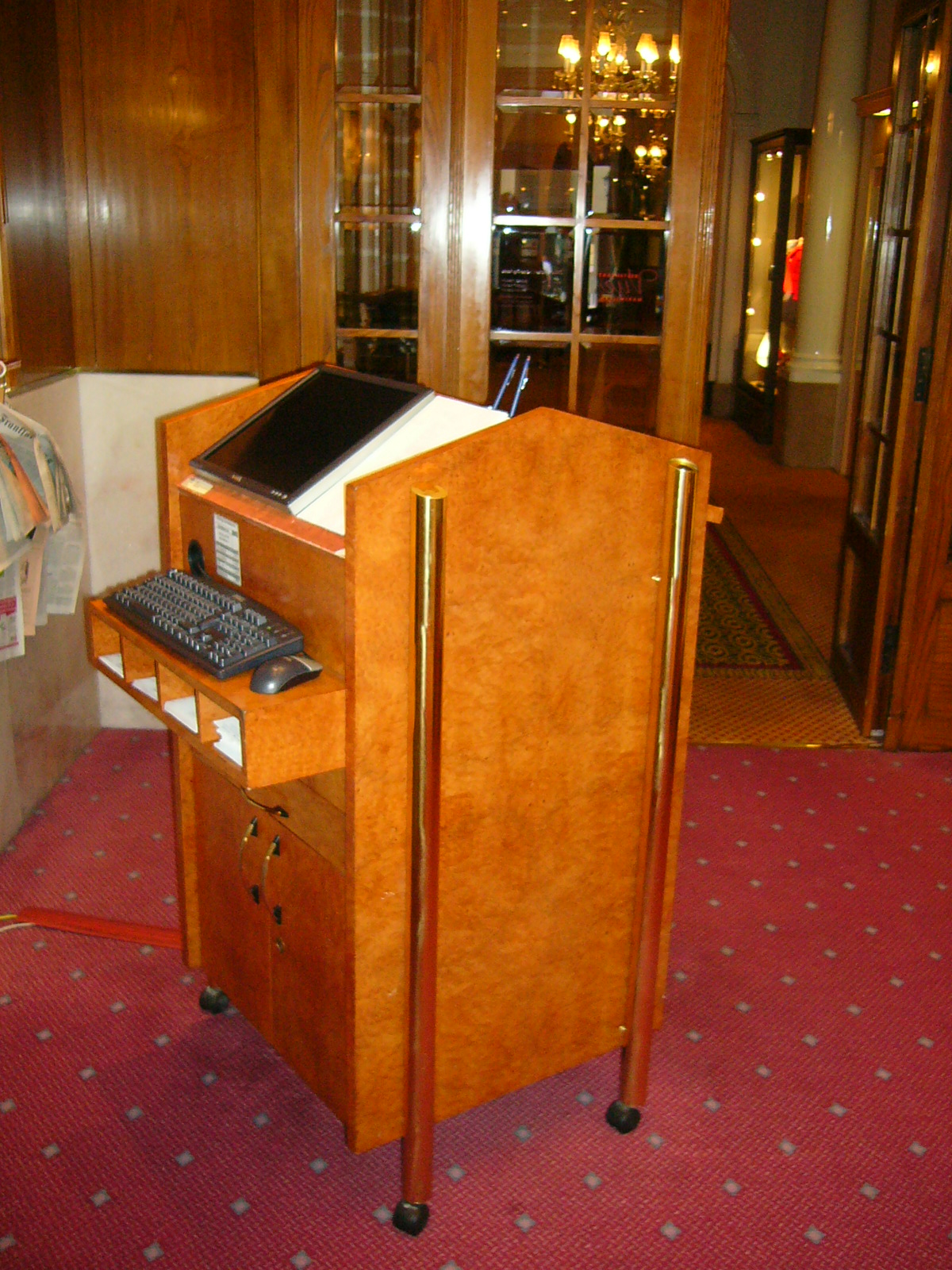
Hotels and restaurants use computerized reservations systems to manage demand and supply.

Locate and target market segments with different demand patterns – e.g. a ski resort could develop fishing and sight-seeing packages for bushwalkers and anglers to build demand during traditional off peak seasons.
Develop innovative products for off peak periods – e.g. an airline could develop mystery flights, fly over Antarctica specials, singles flights, blues or jazz flights, gourmet flights, fight sensitivity training flights for nervous travelers, Winter wonderland specials, etc. (a medium term strategy).
Use efficiency based pricing methods – price incentives, such as time-based differential pricing (peak and off peak); market-based differential pricing (e.g. economy and business class); price-volume discounts, use pricing to encourage pre-booking which facilitates superior forecasting e.g. Car hire company, Uber, uses surge pricing during periods of high demand.
Use reservations systems to manage demand – yield management or dynamic pricing which uses a combination of segment-by-segment demand forecasting alongside subtle price adjustments (requires sophisticated software programs to analyze demand) e.g. hotels and airlines utilize yield management to set prices based on demand patterns.
Use stand-by systems – allow customers the option of taking up last minute vacancies or "no-show" places.
Shape demand- management may attempt to shape demand patterns through customer education programs or lobbying e.g. encourage engaged couples to hold wedding ceremonies on days other than Saturday spread demand more evenly across the days of the week, lobby different state authorities to stagger scheduled school holiday periods in order to spread demand for holiday services more evenly across the year.

When demand exceeds capacity, then reductions in service quality are a probable outcome. Over-crowding and lengthy waiting lines potentially erode the customer experience and place stresses on employees and the service system. Employees may compensate by minimizing the time spent with each customer in an effort to serve more people, but such responses have the potential to introduce human error into service delivery. When capacity far exceeds supply, then capacity becomes idle. Spare capacity is unproductive and an inefficient use of resources. A short-term solution to spare capacity is to seek reductions in operating costs. For instance, management might ask staff to take leave, reduce number of check in counters open, limit number lifts operating and close off entire floors of a building to reduce operating costs during off peak periods as a means of achieving cost savings. In addition, routine maintenance tasks or planned refurbishment activities, which involve downtime, should be carried out during off peak periods to minimize disruption to patrons.

==== Managing waiting lines ====
When demand exceeds capacity, customers may have to wait for services. Lovelock identifies a range of different types of waiting lines or queuing systems:

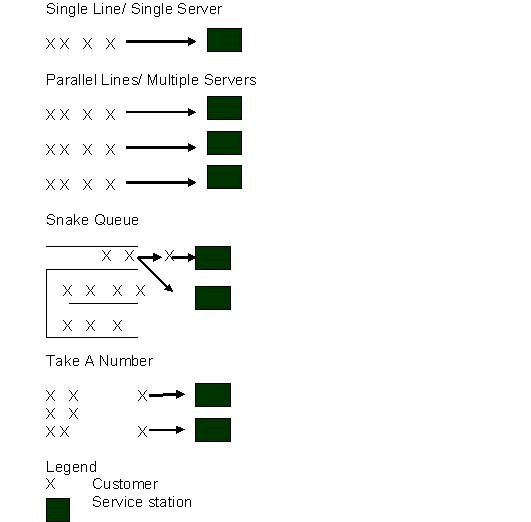
Different types of queues

Single Line/ Single Server Queues: Single line queues are among the most common. Examples can be found in cafes and sandwich bars around town. At Disneyland, for example, single line queues are employed despite the large numbers of visitors. However, Disney provides roving entertainers to visit waiting lines as a form of distraction.

Parallel Lines/ Multiple Servers: Parallel lines are useful when there is more than one service station. However a major drawback is lines often move at different speeds. When patrons perceive that their line is moving more slowly, it can give rise to a sense of inequity. A variation of this type of queue is to devote some stations to different classes of customer. This variation is used in supermarkets where an express lane can be set up for customers with a small basket of items. It is also used at airport check-in counters where different lines form for economy class passengers and business class passengers.

Snake Queue: The snake queue employs a physical race to guide customers through to the service station. Its main advantage is that all customers will be served on a first-in, first served basis, which for many people is the fairest system.

Take a Number: In the take a number system customers do not need to form orderly queues once they have been assigned a number. Instead, customers can relax, enjoy the service firm's facilities until their number is called.

Other queue systems: Of course, other types of system can be found in service environments. Hospital emergency department, for example, use Triage in which patients are assessed by a triage nurse who ranks the severity of their condition and assigns them to a doctor based on need.

== Program ==
The argument that services require different marketing strategies is based on the insight that services are fundamentally different to goods and that services marketing requires different models to understand the marketing of services to customers. The "marketing mix" (also known as the four Ps) is a foundation concept in marketing and has defined the so-called managerial approach since the 1960s. The marketing mix or marketing program is understood to refer to the "set of marketing tools that the firm uses to pursue its marketing objectives in the target market". The traditional marketing mix refers to four broad levels of marketing decision, namely: product, price, promotion, and place.

=== Expanded and modified marketing mix ===
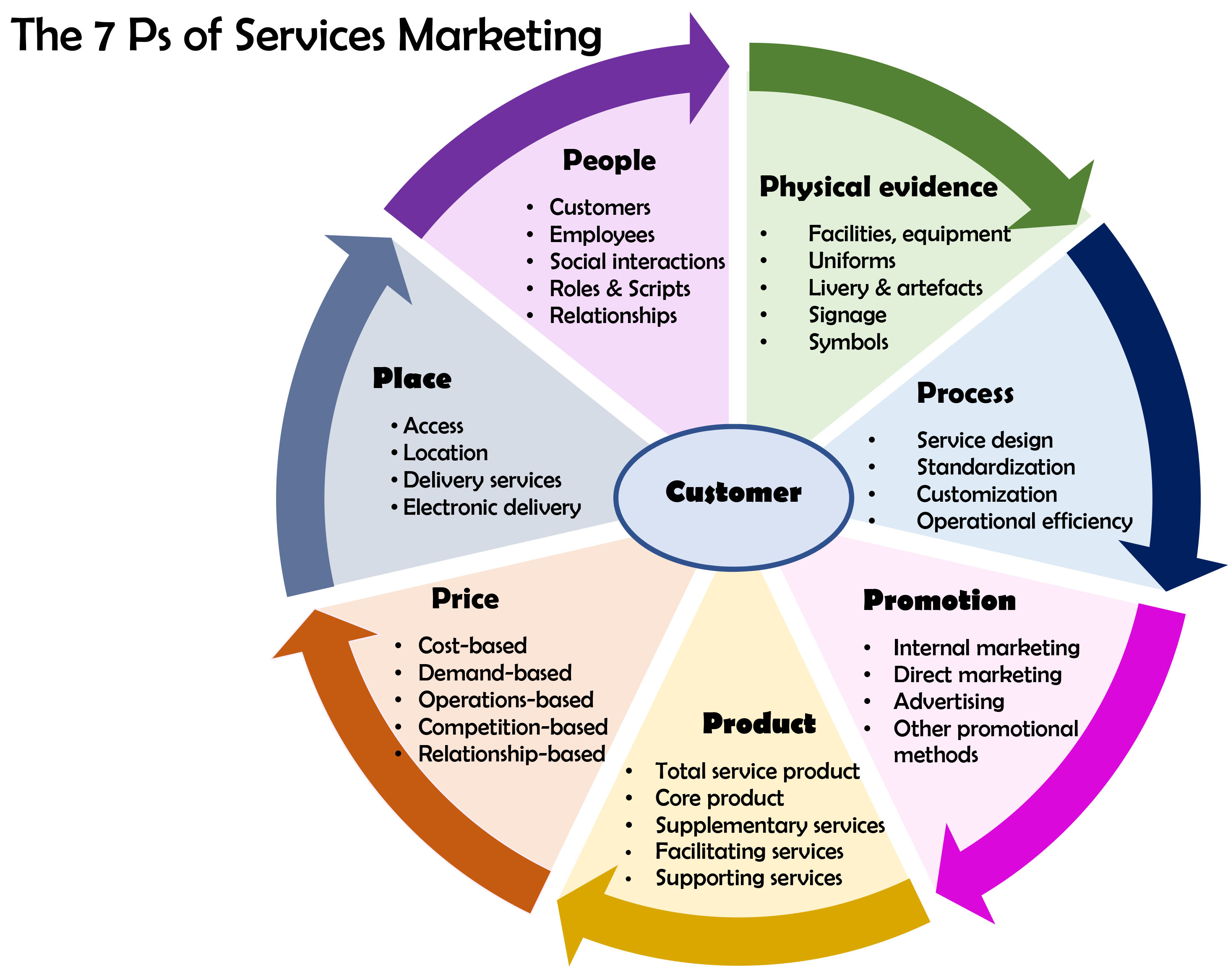
The seven Ps of services marketing

The prospect of expanding and modifying the marketing mix for services first took hold at the inaugural AMA Conference dedicated to Services Marketing in 1981, and built on earlier theoretical works pointing to many important limitations of the 4 Ps concept. Taken collectively, the papers presented at that conference indicate that service marketers were thinking about a revision to the general marketing mix based on an understanding that services were fundamentally different to products, and therefore required different tools and strategies. At the Services Marketing Conference in 1981, Booms and Bitner proposed a model of seven Ps, comprising the original four Ps plus process, people and physical evidence, as being more applicable for services marketing. Since then there have been a number of different proposals for a service marketing mix (with various numbers of Ps – 6 Ps, 7 Ps, 8 Ps, 9 Ps and occasionally more). The model of 7 Ps has gained widespread acceptance, to the extent that some theorists have argued for the 7 Ps framework proposed by Booms and Bitner to be applied to products as a replacement for the four Ps.

The extended marketing mix for services is more than the simple addition of three extra Ps. Rather it also modifies the traditional mix of product, price, place and promotion for superior application to services.

==== Product ====
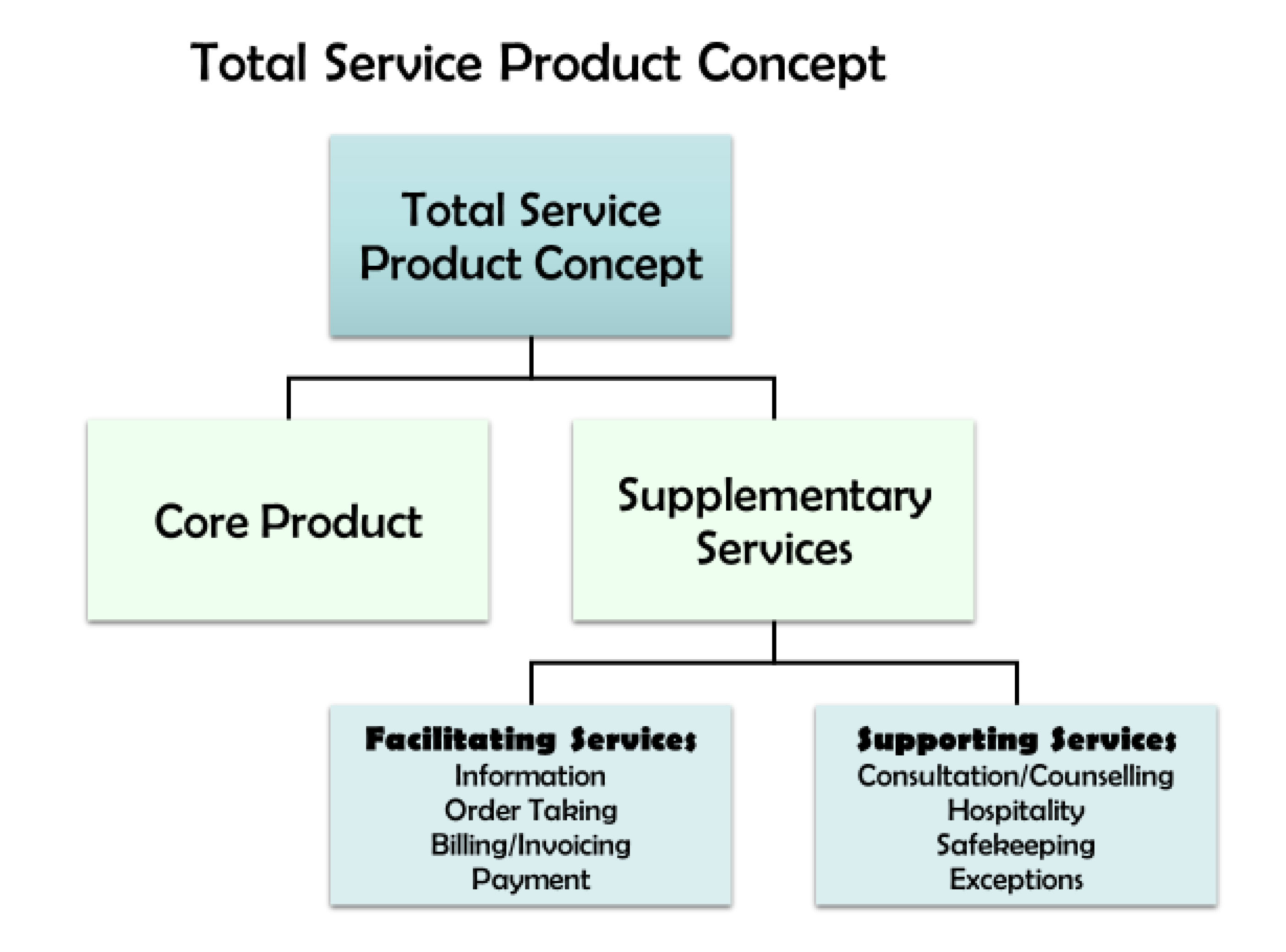
Visualization of the total service product concept

Service products are conceptualized as consisting of a bundle of tangible and intangible elements:

Core service: the basic reason for the business; that which solves consumer problems

Supplementary goods and services: supplements or adds value to the core product and helps differentiate the service from competitors (e.g. consultation, safe-keeping, hospitality, exceptions)

Facilitating services: (sometimes called delivery services): Facilitate the delivery and consumption of the core service (are essential to delivery) (e.g. information provision, order-taking, billing, payment methods)

Supporting services: support the core and could be eliminated without destabilizing the core.

The distinction between supplementary and facilitating services varies, depending on the nature of the service. For instance, the provision of coffee and tea would be considered a supporting service in a bank, but would be a facilitating service in a bed and breakfast facility. Whether an element is classified as facilitating or supporting depends on the context.

==== Price ====
Service marketers consider a range of other issues in price setting and management of prices:

- Price charged: the traditional pricing decision.
- Timing of payment: Given that customers are part of the service process and that some customers remain in the process for days, months or even years (e.g. guest house, hotel stay, university tuition), decisions must be made about whether to request payment at time when the service encounter is initiated, during the encounter or on termination of an encounter. Deposits, installments and exit fees are all options that can be considered.
- Mode of payment: Given that customers enter into long term relationships with service providers, it is possible that some patrons will expect to be able to pay on account. Payment options include: EFTPOS, direct transfer, cash/ credit cheque, invoice.

Many service firms operate in industries where price is restricted by professional codes of conduct or by government influences which may have implications for pricing. It is possible to identify three broad scenarios:

- Services subject to public regulation (e.g. healthcare, public transport)
- Services subject to formal self-regulation (e.g. universities, schools)
- Services Subject to regulation of marketplace (e.g. hospitality, tourism, leisure services)

In situations where the service is subject to some type of public regulation, government departments may establish ceiling prices which effectively limit the amount that can be charged.

The concept of a social price may be more important for service marketers. A social price refers to "non financial aspects of price". Fine identifies four types of social price: Time, Effort, Lifestyle and Psyche. In effect, this means that consumers may be more acutely aware of the opportunity costs associated with the consumption of a service. In practice, this may mean that consumers of services experience a heightened sense of temporal risk.

The most widely used pricing tactics in services marketing are:

- High or low differential pricing
- Flexible pricing
- Diversionary pricing
- Offset pricing
- Guaranteed pricing
- Loss leader pricing
- Discounted pricing

==== Place ====
In making place decisions, there are several related questions which must be asked. What is the purpose of the distribution program? Who are the customers? Who should the intermediaries be?

- Purpose of Distribution: Mass distribution; selective distribution or exclusive distribution
- Number of levels in distribution channel: Direct distribution vs multi-marketing and location decisions
- Intermediaries: Agents versus Resellers; Brokers and other parties; Surrogate Consumers

=== The expanded marketing mix ===
Contemporary service marketing texts tend to be organized around a framework of seven Ps or eight Ps. The 7 Ps comprise the original 4 Ps, plus process, people, physical environment. The eight Ps framework; comprises the 7 Ps plus performance which refers to the standards of service performance or service quality.

==== Physical evidence ====
Given the intangible nature of services, consumers often rely on the physical evidence to evaluate service quality. Therefore, service marketers must manage the physical evidence – which includes any element of the service environment which impacts on one or more of the customers five senses – the sense of smell, taste, hearing, sight and touch. Theorists identify two types of physical evidence, namely;

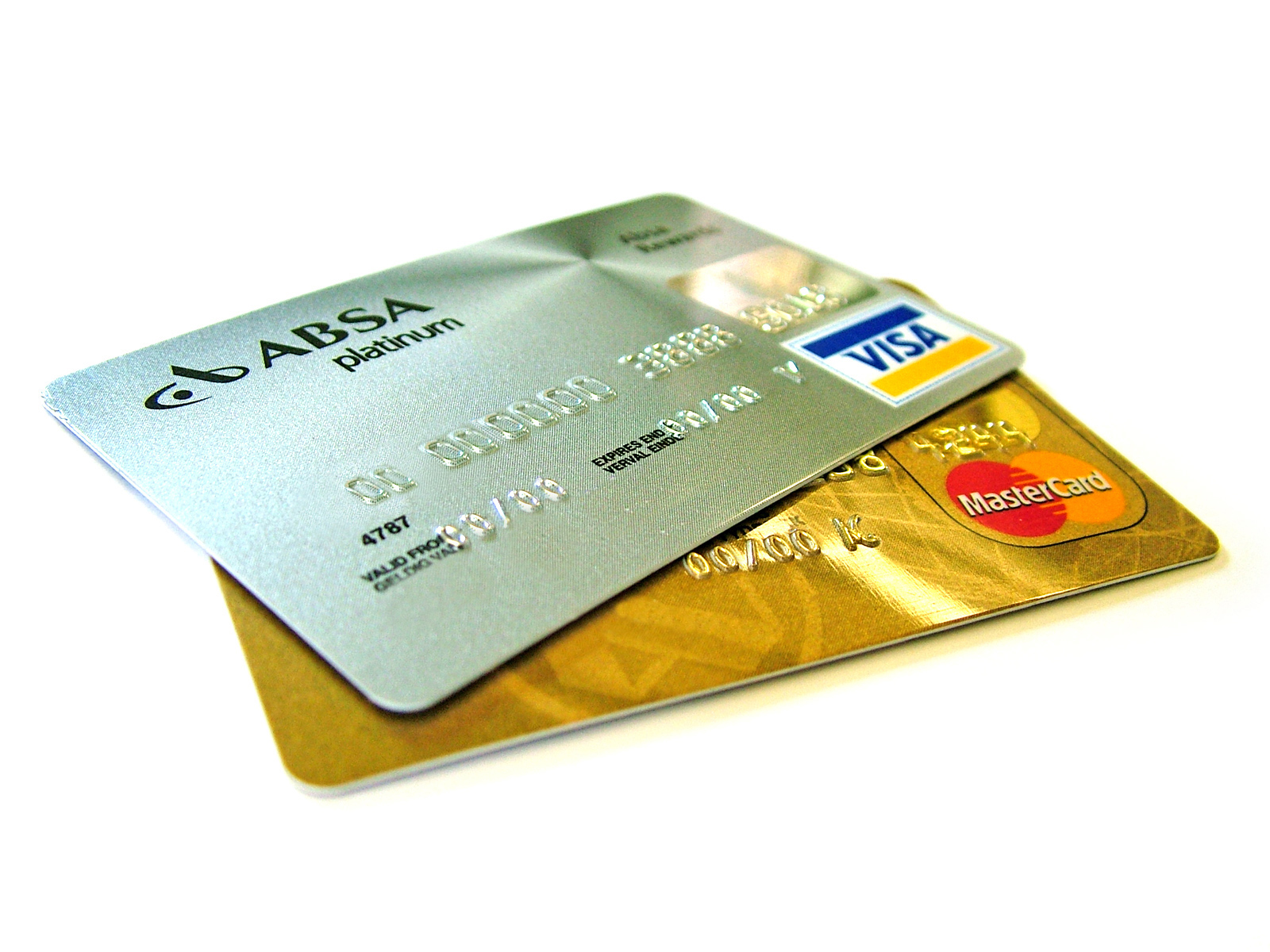
Credit cards have no independent value unless backed by the service. Credit cards are a type of peripheral evidence.

Peripheral evidence: is actually possessed as part of the purchase of a service but has no independent value unless backed by the service. e.g. a cheque book, credit card, admission ticket, hotel stationery.
Essential evidence: unlike peripheral evidence cannot be possessed by the client. It contributes to ambience or image e.g. building and furnishings, layout, equipment, people, etc.

A number of different theoretical traditions can be used to inform the study of service environments including stimulus-organism-response (SOR) models; environmental psychology; semiotics and Servicescapes.

===== Stimulus-response models =====
The SOR model (stimulus→organism→response model) describes the way that organisms, which includes both customers and employees, respond to environmental stimuli. In a service setting the environmental stimuli might include lighting, ambient temperature, background music, layout and interior-design. In essence, the model proposes that people's responses exhibit both emotional and behavioural responses to stimuli in the external environment.

===== Environmental psychology =====
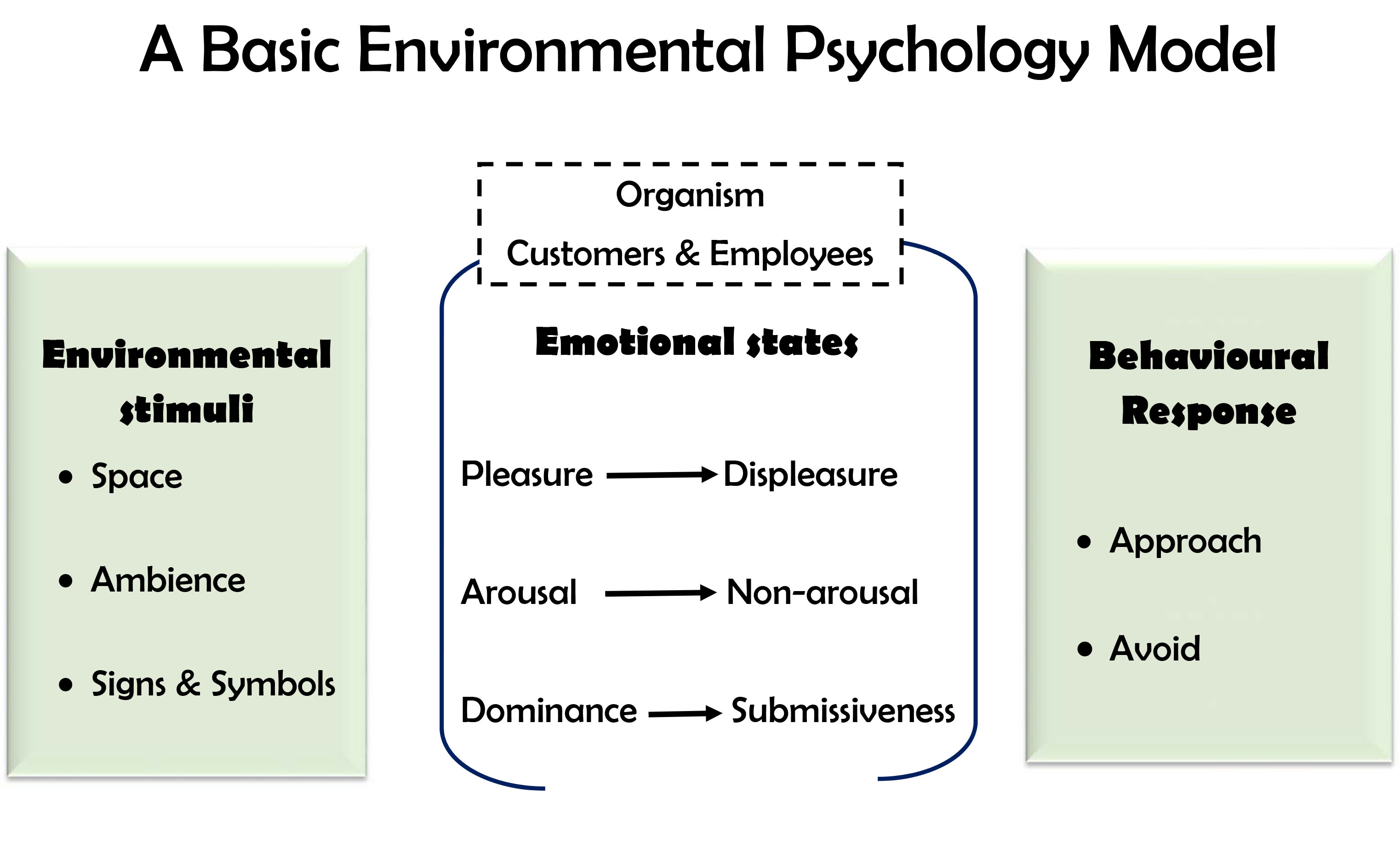

Environmental psychologists investigate the impact of spatial environments on behaviour. Emotional responses to environmental stimuli fall into three dimensions; pleasure, arousal and dominance. The individual's emotional state is thought to mediate the behavioural response, namely approach or avoidance behaviour towards the environment. Architects and designers can use insights from environmental psychology to design environments that promote desired emotional or behavioural outcomes.

Three emotional responses are suggested in the model. These responses should be understood as a continuum, rather than a discrete emotion, and customers can be visualized as falling anywhere along the continuum.

Pleasure–displeasure refers to the emotional state reflecting the degree to which consumers and employees are satisfied with the service experience.

Arousal–non-arousal refers to the emotional state that reflects the degree to which consumers and employees feel excited and stimulated.

Dominance–submissiveness refers to the emotional state that reflects the degree to which consumers and employees feel in control and able to act freely within the service environment.

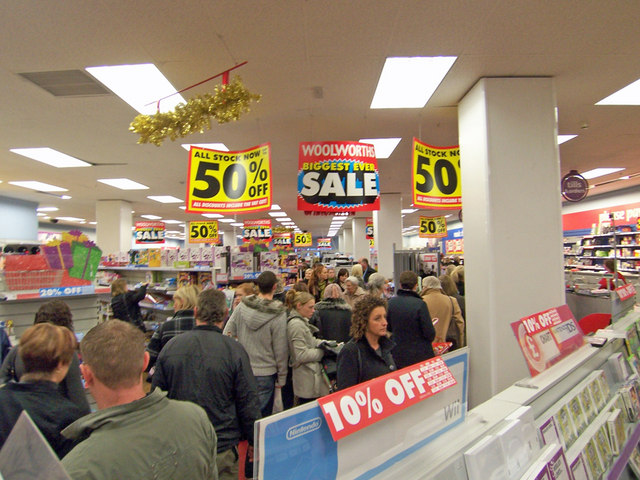
Crowded, disorganised, unpredictable environments are said to be high load.

The individual's emotional response mediate the individual's behavioural response of Approach→ Avoidance. Approach refers to the act of physically moving towards something while avoidance interferes with people's ability to interact. In a service environment, approach behaviours might be characterized by a desire to explore an unfamiliar environment, remain in the service environment, interact with the environment and with other persons in the environment and a willingness to perform tasks within that environment. Avoid behaviours are characterized by a desire to leave the establishment, ignore the service environment, and feelings disappointment with the service experience. Environments in which people feel they lack control are unattractive. Customers often understand the concept of approach intuitively when they comment that a particular place "looks inviting". The desired level of emotional arousal depends on the situation. For example, at a gym arousal might be more important than pleasure (No Pain; No gain). In a leisure setting, pleasure might be more important. If the environment pleases, then the customer will be induced to stay longer and explore all that the service has to offer. Too much arousal can be counter-productive. For instance, a romantic couple might feel out of place in a busy, noisy and cluttered restaurant. Obviously, some level of arousal is necessary as a motivation to buy. The longer a customer stays in an environment, the greater the opportunities to cross-sell a range of service offerings.

Mehrabian and Russell identified two types of environment based on the degree of information processing and stimulation:

High load: Environments that are unfamiliar, novel, complex, unpredictable or crowded are high load

Low load: Environments that are familiar, simple, unsurprising and well organized are low load.

Activities or tasks that are low load require a more stimulating environment for optimum performance. If the task to be performed in relatively simple, routine or boring then users benefit from a slightly more stimulating environment. On the other hand, tasks that are complex or difficult may benefit from a low load environment. In a service environment, a high load environment encourages patrons to enter and explore the various service offerings and spaces.

===== Servicescapes =====
Simplified servicescapes model

The servicescapes model was developed by Mary Jo Bitner and published in 1992. It is an applied model, specifically developed to inform the analysis of service environments, and was influenced by both stimulus-response theory and environmental psychology.

====== Physical environment dimensions ======
As the diagram of the servicescapes model illustrates, the service environment consists of physical environment dimensions which act as stimuli. Environmental simulis are normally considered as three broad categories including:

Ambient Conditions: Temperature, air quality, ambient noise, lighting, background music, odor, etc.

Space/ Function: Equipment such as cash registers, layout, furnishings and furniture, etc.

Signs, symbols & Artefacts: Directional signage, personal artefacts (e.g. souvenirs, mementos), corporate livery and logos, style of décor (including colour schemes), symbols etc

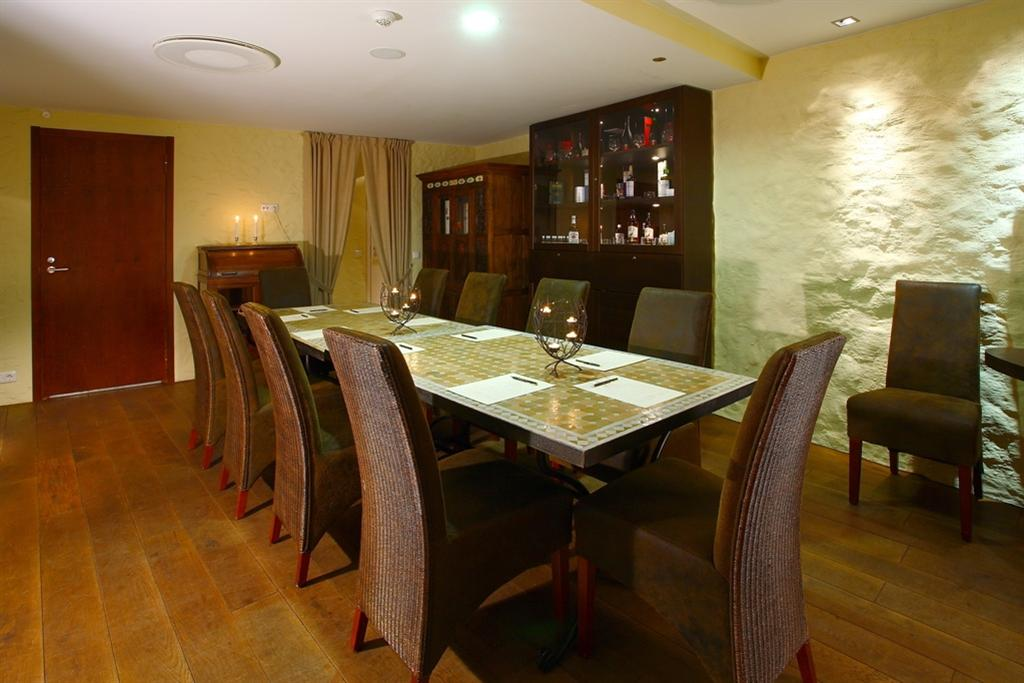
The seminar room at the Savoy Hotel clearly signals an up-market positioning. Spacious room, high backed covered chairs, timber surfaces and a complementary bar combine to communicate that this in intended for corporate use.

Each element in the physical environment serves specific roles -and some may perform multiple roles. Signage may provide information, but may also serve to assist customers navigate their way through a complex service environment. For instance, furnishings may serve a functional role in that they provide seating, but the construction materials, such as fabric, tapestry and velvet may serve a symbolic role. Plush fabrics and generous drapery may suggest an elegant, up-market venue, while plastic chairs may signify an inexpensive, family-friendly venue. When evaluating the servicescape, the combined effect of all the elements must also be taken into consideration.

====== The holistic environment ======
When consumers enter a servicescape, they scan the ambient conditions, layout, furnishings and artefacts and aggregate them to derive an overall impression of the environment. In other words, the holistic environment represents the cumulative effect of multiple stimuli, most of which are processed within a split second. These types of global judgments represent the summation of processing multiple stimuli to form a single, overall impression in the consumer's mind.

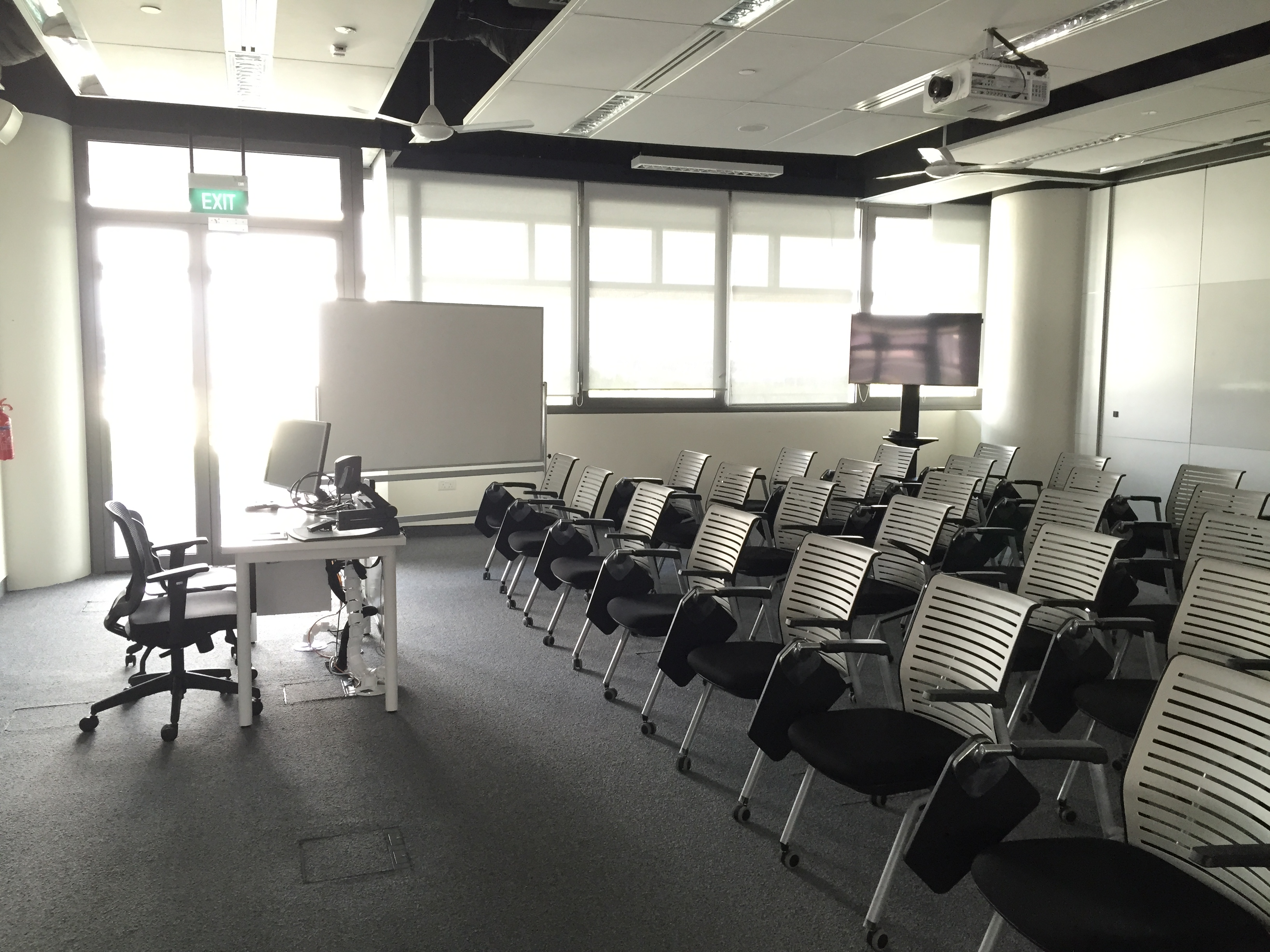
The seminar room at Singapore University clearly signals an institutional application. Functional seating, ceiling mounted projectors, whiteboard, fluorescent lighting and schoolroom layout combine to suggest that the space is part of a practical educational environment.

Through careful design of the physical environment and ambient conditions, managers are able to communicate the service firm's values and positioning. Ideally, the physical environment will be designed to achieve desired behavioural outcomes. Clever use of space can be used to encourage patrons to stay longer since longer stays result in more opportunities to sell services. At other times, the ambient conditions can be manipulated to encourage avoidance behaviour. For example, at the end of a busy night of trading, a bar manager might turn the air conditioning up, turn up the lights, turn off the background music and start stacking chairs on top of tables. These actions send a signal to patrons that it is closing time.

====== Customers and employees: moderating and mediating factors ======
Customers and employees represent the two groups that regularly inhabit the servicescape. Their perceptions of the environment are likely to differ, because each comes to the space with different purposes and motivations. For example, a waiter in a restaurant is likely to be pleased to see a crowded dining room because more customers means more tips. Customers, on the other hand, might be less pleased with a crowded space because the noise and queues have the potential to diminish the service experience.

In the servicescape model, a moderator is anything that changes the standard stimulus-response emotional states of pleasure-displeasure, arousal-non-arousal or dominance-submissiveness while the mediator explains the response behaviour, typically in terms of internal responses (cognitive, emotional and physiological responses). The consumer's response to an environment depends, at least in part, on situational factors such as the purpose or reason for being in the environment. For example, a waiter in a restaurant is likely to be pleased to see a crowded dining room because more customers means more tips. Customers, on the other hand, might be less pleased with a crowded space because the noise and queues have the potential to diminish the service experience.

====== Behavioural response ======
The model shows that there are different types of response – individual response (approach and avoid) and interaction responses (e.g. social interactions).

In the context of servicescapes, approach has a special meaning. It refers to how customers utilize the space, during and after the service encounter. Approach behaviours demonstrated during the encounter include:

Enter and explore – exhibiting a desire to explore the total service offering, a willingness to do more things, keen to learn about all the company's products and services; showing an interest in cross-selling opportunities as presented

Stay longer – exhibiting a willingness to remain within the physical environment; longer stays present more opportunities for cross-selling, up-selling or impulse buying. Some studies have shown a correlation between length of stay and the size of average patron expenditure

Carry out plan – exhibiting a willingness to act on information provided, fully immerse themselves in the experience and a determination to achieve personal goals

Social interactions refer to customer-employee interactions as well as customer-customer interactions. In some services, such as clubs, bars and tours, the act of meeting other people and interacting with other customers forms an integral part of the service experience. Managers need to think about design features that can be used to facilitate interactions between patrons. For instance, some cafeterias and casual dining establishments install communal dining tables for the express purpose of encouraging customers to mix and socialize.

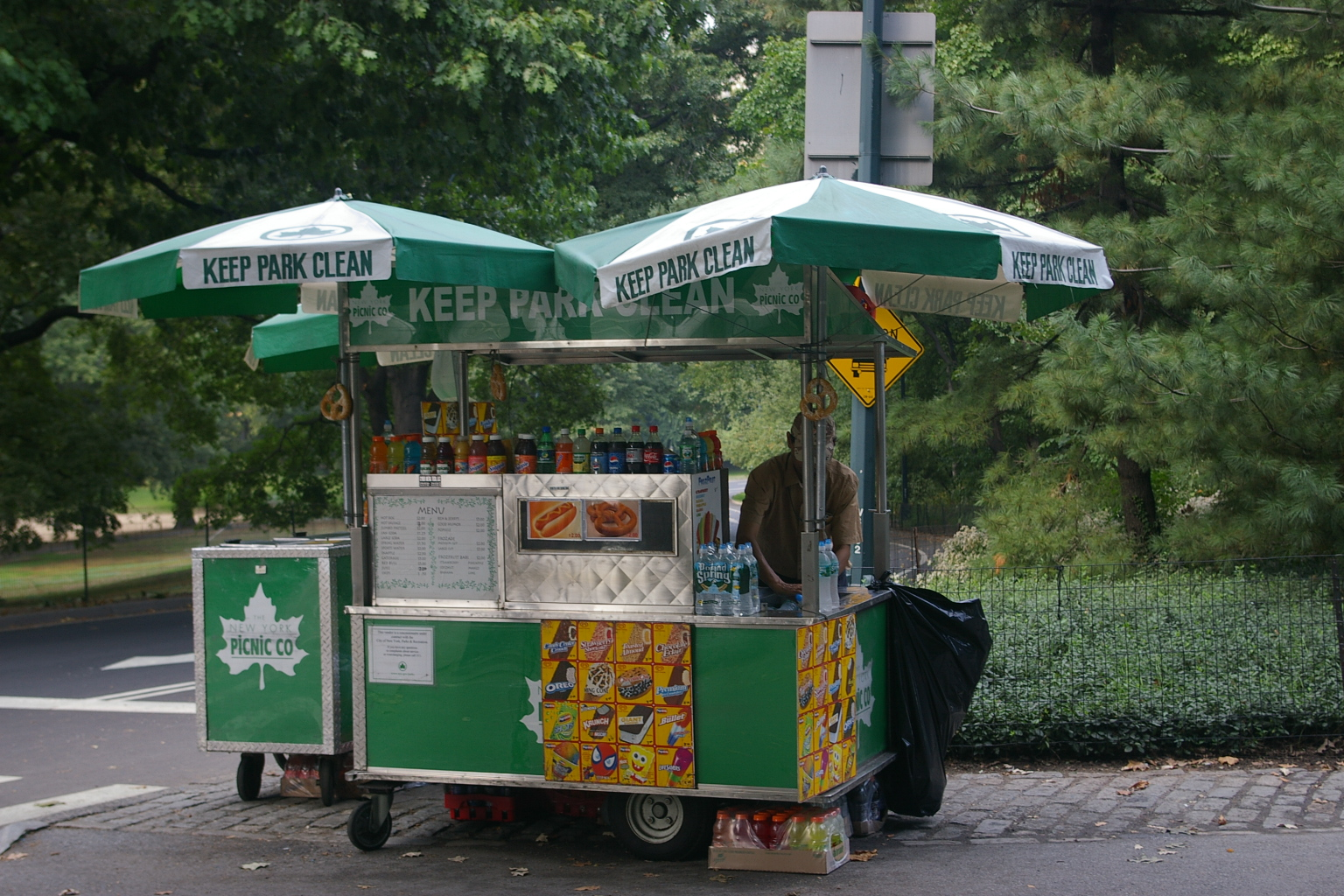
Kiosks are lean servicescapes - simple, orderly, few employees, few spaces and familiar environments.

Different types of approach behaviours demonstrated at the conclusion of the encounter or after the encounter may include: affiliation – a willingness to become a regular user, form intention to revisit; commitment – the formation of intention to become brand advocate, to provide referrals, write favourable online reviews or give positive word-of-mouth recommendations.

====== Types of servicescape ======
Bitner's pioneering work on servicescapes identified two broad types of service environment:

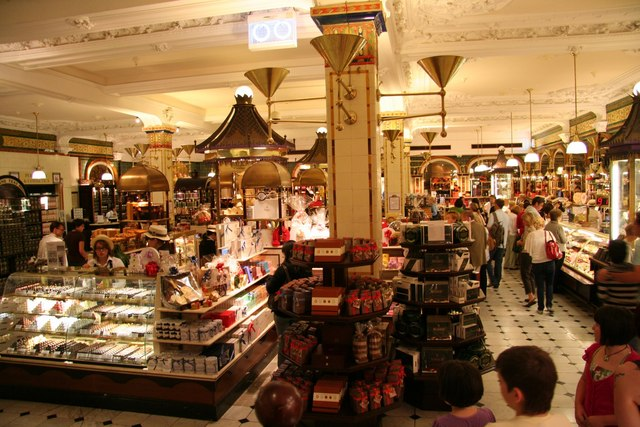
Department stores offer an elaborate servicescape with multiple levels and spaces, rich in physical elements and symbolism.

Lean servicescapes – environments that comprise relatively few spaces, contain few elements and involve few interactions between customers and employees. e.g. kiosks, vending machines, self-service retail outlets, fast food outlets. Designing lean environments is relatively straight-forward

Elaborate servicescapes – environments that comprise multiple spaces, are rich in physical elements and symbolism, involve high contact services with many interactions between customers and employees. Examples include international hotels and ocean liners with guest accommodation, concierge, bars, restaurants, swimming pools, gymnasiums and other supplementary services where guests interact with multiple personnel during their stay which might extend over multiple days. Designing elaborate environments requires skilled design teams who are fully apprised of the desired behavioural outcomes and the corporate vision.

According to the model's developer, the servicescape acts like a "product's package" – by communicating a total image to customers and providing information about how to use the service. It can also serve as a point of difference by signalling which segments of the market are served, positioning the organization and conveying competitive distinctiveness.

=== Service process ===
When customers enter a service firm they participate in a process. During that process, customers become quasi-employees; that is they are partial producers and they have the opportunity to see the organization from the employee's perspective. To use a manufacturing analogy, customers are able to examine 'unfinished goods' – that is faulty and defective goods, glitches in the production system are in full view, with obvious implications for customer enjoyment and satisfaction. In addition, customers interactions with both employees and other customers becomes part of the total service experience with obvious implications for service quality and productivity. Both customers and staff must be educated to effectively use the process. Controlling the service delivery process is more than a simple management issue. The customer's presence in the system means that the service process must be treated as a marketing issue.

==== Blueprinting for design and diagnosis ====
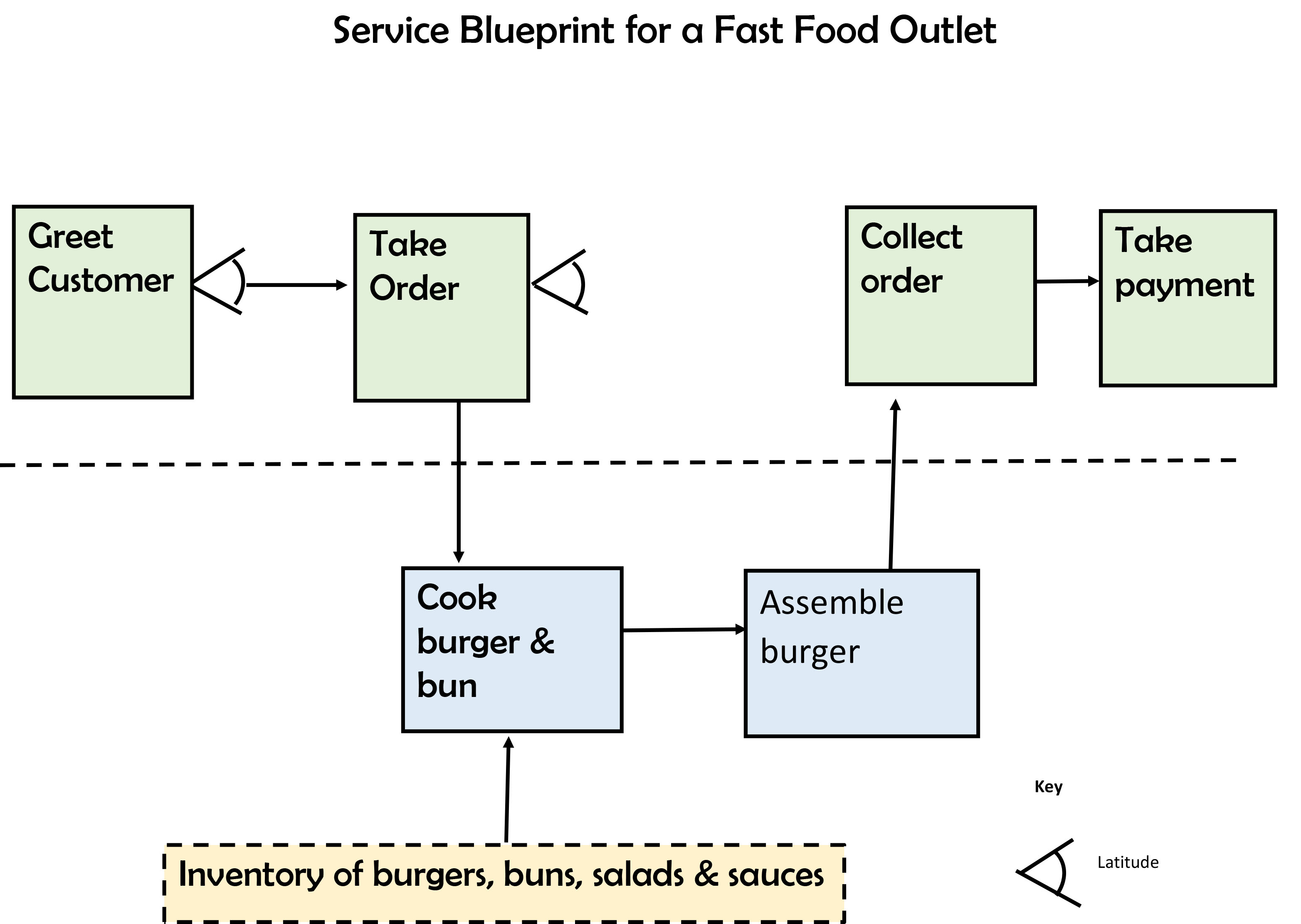
A service blueprint for a hypothetical fast food outlet

Blueprinting is a technique designed to document the visible customer experience. In its simplest form, the service blueprint is an applied process chart which shows the service delivery process from the customer's perspective. The original service blueprint is a highly visual, graphical map that delineates the key contact points in the service process and the nature of the contact – whether with physical evidence, personnel or procedures. It can be seen as a two dimensional map in which the horizontal axis represents time and the vertical axis represents the basic steps in the process. A line of visibility is included to separate actions visible to the customer from actions out of sight. Employee latitude, which refers to the amount of discretion given to employees to vary the service process, is shown on the map a call-out sign attached to the step a shown in the figure. Process complexity is shown simply by the number of steps in the process.

It was originally intended to be used as a tool to assist with service design and structural positioning. However, since its inception it has been used extensively as a diagnostic tool, used to detect operational inefficiencies and potential trouble spots including fail points and bottlenecks. In the event that any deficiencies are identified by the blueprinting process, management can develop operational standards for critical steps in the process.

When interpreting service blueprints, there are two basic considerations, complexity and divergence. Complexity refers to the number and intricacy of the steps required to perform the service. Divergence refers to the degree of latitude, freedom, judgment, discretion, variability or situational adaptation permitted within any step of the process.

Manipulations of the blueprint diagram might include increasing complexity, by adding more steps, or increasing divergence by allowing employees greater latitude in varying each step. In general, service processes that include high levels of employee discretion to vary steps to meet the needs of individual customers are moving towards customization. On the other hand, reducing divergence, by standardizing each step, often adds to complexity, but can result in a production-line approach to service process design. By manipulating complexity and divergence, it is possible to envisage four different positioning strategies:

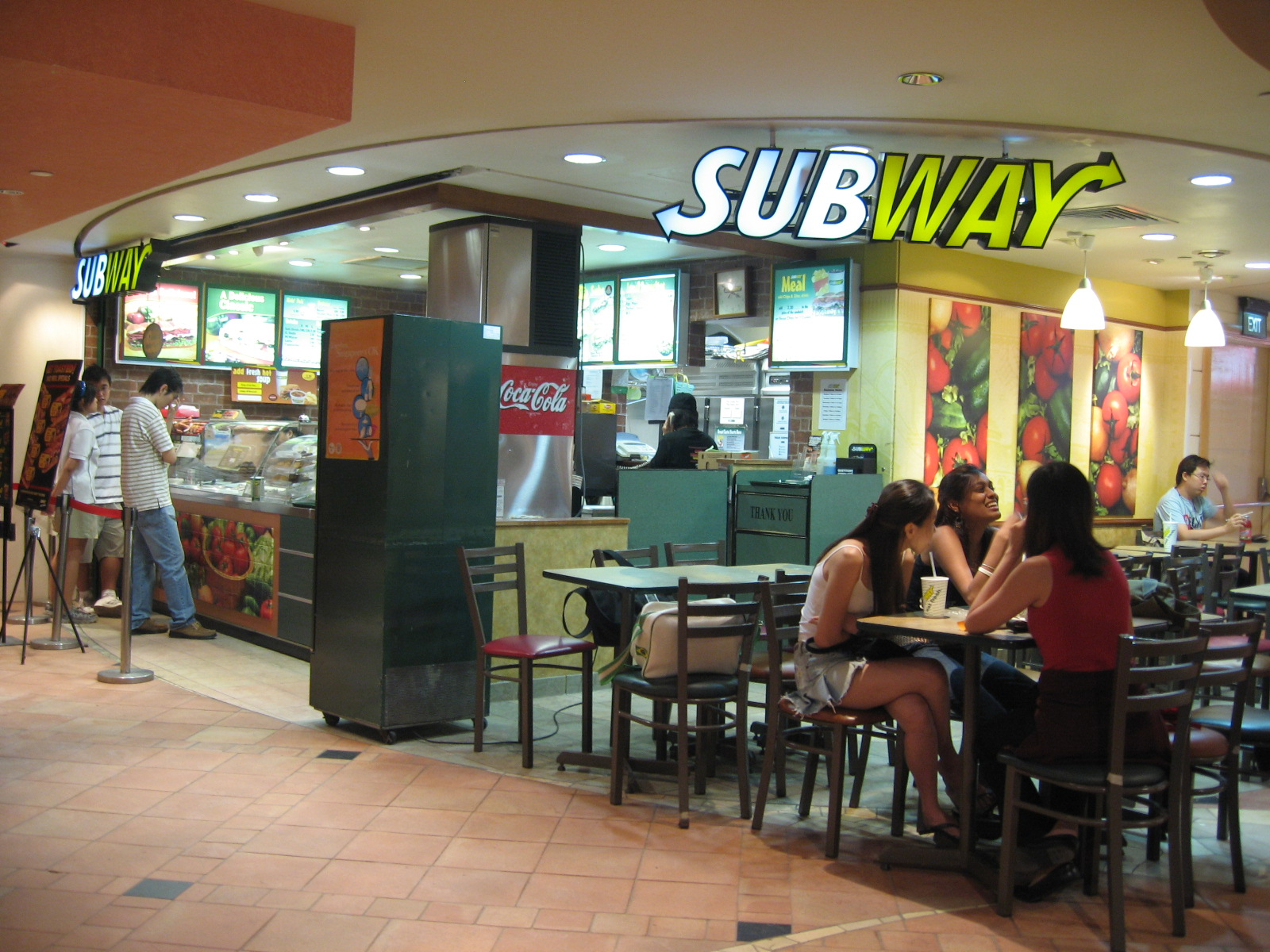
Customers doing the 'Subway shuffle' as they move along the race selecting their fillings. Subway has designed the store to facilitate a streamlined process.

Reduced Complexity: Specialization strategy
Reduced Divergence: Volume-operations
Increase Complexity: Product development
Increased Divergence: Niche market strategy

Subway sandwich bars provide an excellent example of how a business can integrate both process design and the servicescape into the customer's in-store experience. Like many fast food restaurants, Subway utilizes a race to corral customers and move them in a one-way direction. Prominently displayed 'In' and 'Out' signage reinforces the direction of the desired traffic flow. Customers can peruse an overhead backlit menu while they are waiting in line which speeds up the order-taking process and reduces opportunities for bottlenecks. Other signage provides customers with information about the Subway process e.g. select bread, select filling, select sauce, pay and exit. The arrangement of food behind the glass counter not only displays the choice of sandwich fillings, but supports the process since customers must select their preferences in a specific sequence, as they inch their way towards the cash register. In Australia, the distinctive moves used by Subway customers as they shuffle along the race, selecting their sandwich breads and fillings has become affectionately known as the ‘Subway shuffle'. Every aspect of Subway's store design and layout reinforces the core objectives of customization, volume-operations (i.e. rapid turnover) and operational efficiency.

=== People ===
The people dimension refers to the human actors who are participants in the service encounter, namely employees and customers. For many service marketers, the human interaction constitutes the heart of the service experience. Service personnel are important because they are the face of the company and represent the company's values to customers. Customers are important because they are the reason for being in business and are the source of revenue. Service firms must manage interactions between customers and interactions between employees and customers. Scholars have developed the concept of service-profit-chain to understand how customers and firms interact with each other in service settings. Strategically, service personnel are a source of differentiation.

Personnel are said to have a boundary-spanning role because they link the organization with its external environment by interacting with customers and feed information back to the organization As boundary spanners, front line staff are likely to encounter the various stresses associated with that role. Studies have shown that emotional labour can lead to undesirable consequences for employees including job-related stress, burnout, job dissatisfaction and withdrawal. If left untreated, these types of stressors can be very damaging to morale.

Managing the behaviour of customers and employees in the service encounter is difficult. Consistent behaviour cannot be prescribed. It can, however, be nurtured in subtle and indirect ways. Recruitment and training can help to ensure that the service firm employs the right people.

==== A dramaturgical perspective ====
For some marketing theorists, services are analogous to theatre. This analogy is also known as a dramaturgical perspective. In such an analogy, service personnel are the actors, customers are the audience; uniforms are costumes; the work setting is the stage (front-stage for areas where interaction occurs and back-stage for areas off limits to customers); discrete steps in the service process are scenes and finally the words and actions that occur represent the performance.

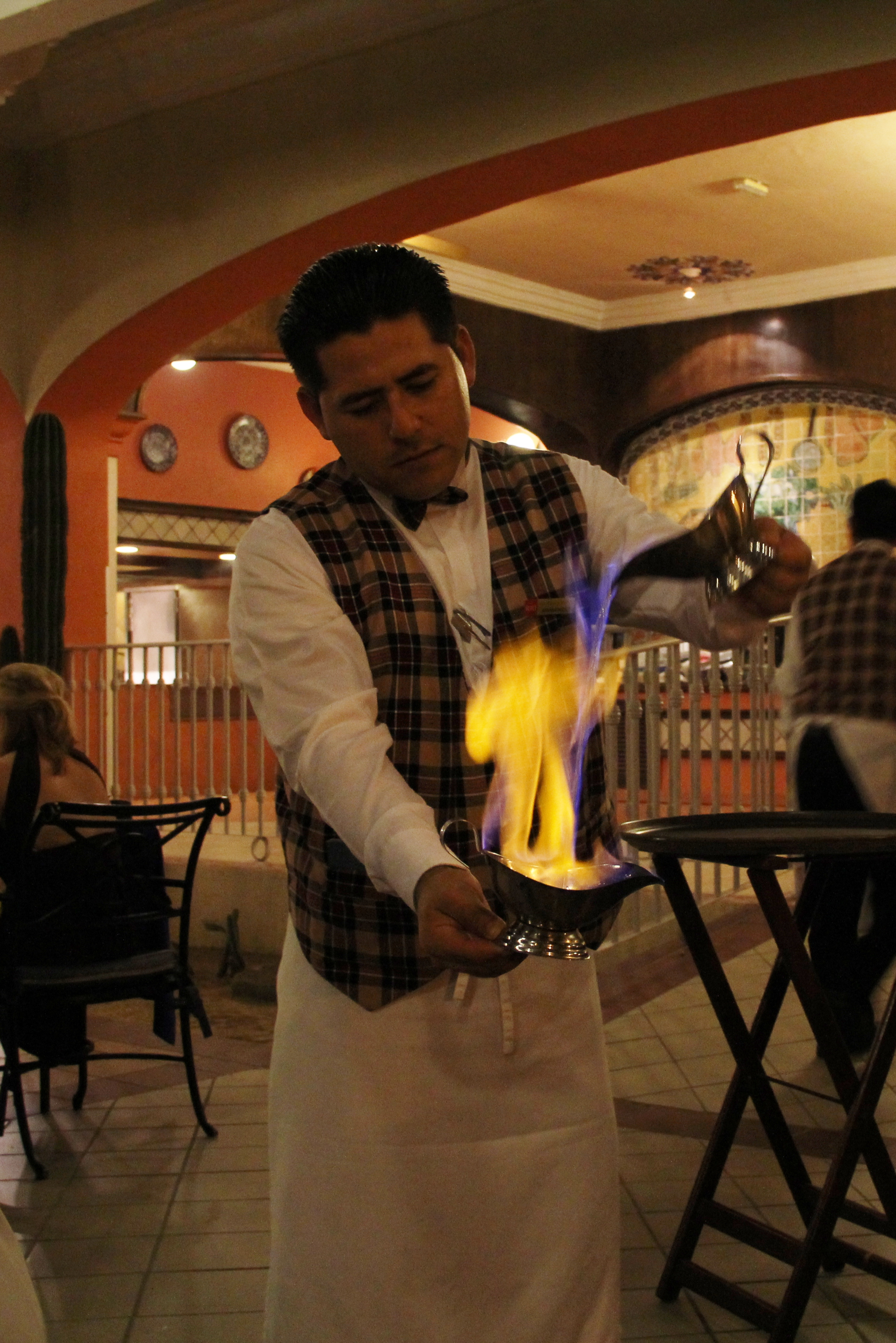
A waiter adds a touch of theatre to the service delivery.

A dramaturgical perspective may be appropriate in specific service contexts:

- high-contact services
- services with large audiences e.g. sporting stadia, educational institutions

Managerial insights generated by a dramaturgical perspective include:

- differentiates services from manufactured goods – provides a framework and vocabulary for describing and evaluating service performances
- legitimizes service work as a skilled performance – recognizes that service work is an artistic and creative endeavour
- provides service workers with a mechanism for understanding and coping with role-related stressors (by understanding that they are 'in character' they are less likely to be personally affected by exchanges with difficult customers and the like)
- focuses managerial attention on recruitment and training – recruiting people with requisite skills and training them as actors
- forces managers to think about the craft of stage management – scripting, staging, scenes, costumes and roles

When asked to perform emotional labour, employees can adopt one of two approaches:

Deep acting: the service worker appraises the service environment and regulate their inner feelings, by actually changing their emotions from the outset

Surface acting: the service worker pretends to express displays of emotion that are consistent with rules and policies

Some evidence suggests that employees who are able to fully immerse themselves in the role and engage in deep acting are more resilient to role-related stress. In addition, deep acting is often seen as more authentic, while surface acting can be seen as contrived and inauthentic. Service work, by its very nature, is stressful for employees. Managers need to develop techniques to assist employees manage role related stress.

=== Performance: Managing service quality ===
There is widespread consensus amongst researchers and practitioners that service quality is an elusive and abstract concept that is difficult to define and measure. It is believed to be a multi-dimensional construct, but there is little consensus as to what constitutes the specific dimensions. Indeed, some researchers argue that the dimensions of service quality may vary from industry to industry and that no universal set of dimensions exists for all contexts.

Within the services marketing literature, there are several different theoretical traditions that inform the understanding of service quality including the Nordic school, the Gaps model (also known as the American model and the performance only approach.

==== The Nordic school ====
The Nordic school was one of the earliest attempts to define and measure service quality. In this school of thought, service quality is conceptualized as consisting of two broad dimensions, namely:

Technical quality: (What was delivered)
Functional quality: (How it was delivered)

The technical dimension can usually be measured – but the functional dimension is difficult to measure due to subjective interpretations which vary from customer to customer.

==== The Gaps model ====
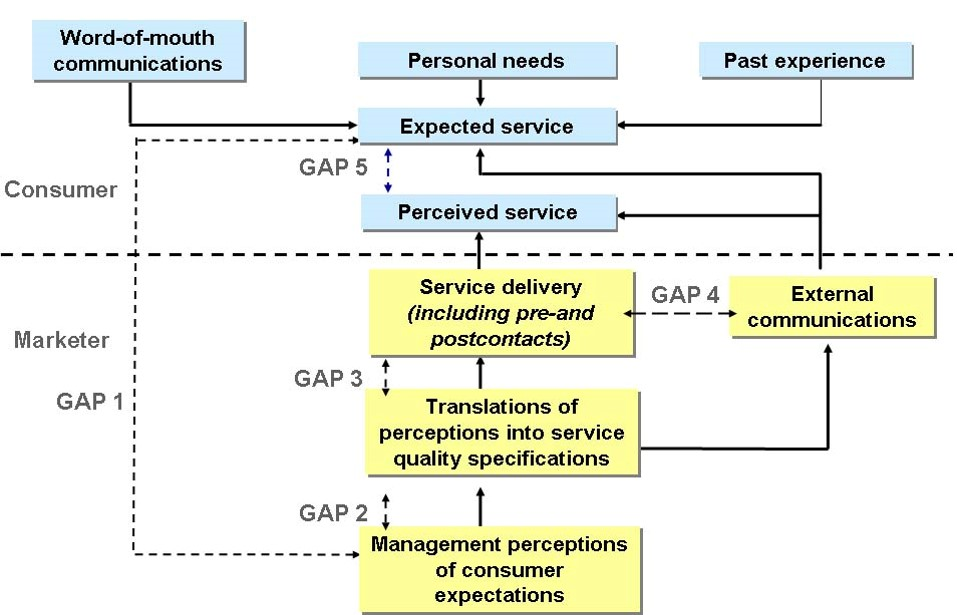
The model of service quality

The model of service quality or the gaps model as it is popularly known, was developed by team of researchers, Parasuraman, Zeithaml and Berry, in the mid to late 1980s. and has become the dominant approach for identifying service quality problems and diagnosing their probable causes. This approach conceptualizes service quality as a gap between consumer's expectations of a forthcoming service encounter and their actual perceptions of that encounter. Accordingly, service quality can be represented by the equation:

SQ = P − E

where

SQ is service quality
P is the individual's perceptions of given service delivery
E is the individual's expectations of a given service delivery

The model which provides the overall conceptual framework helps analysts to identify the service quality gap (Gap 5 in the model) and to understand the probable causes of service quality related problems (Gaps 1-4 in the model). The diagnostic value of the model accounts at least, in part, for the instrument's continuing currency in service quality research.

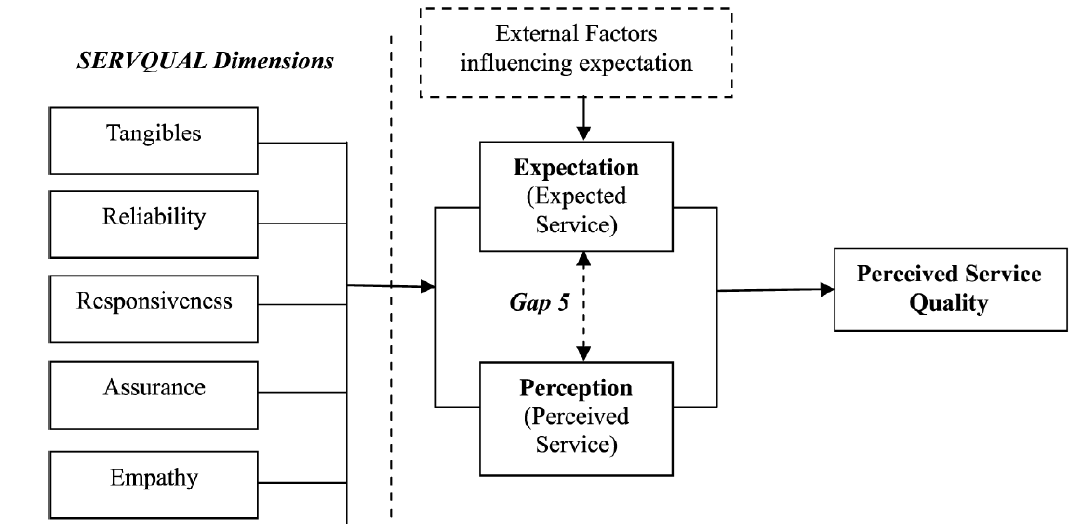
The five dimensions of service quality

The model's developers also devised a research instrument, called SERVQUAL, to measure the size and direction of service quality problems (i.e. gap 5). The questionnaire is multi-dimensional instrument, designed to having capture five dimensions of service quality; namely reliability, assurance, tangibles, empathy and responsiveness, which are believed to represent the consumer's understanding of service quality. The questionnaire consists of matched pairs of items; 22 expectation items and 22 perceptions items, organized into the five dimensions which align with the consumer's mental map of service quality dimensions. Both the expectations component and the perceptions component of the questionnaire consist a total of 22 items, comprising 4 items to capture tangibles, 5 items to capture reliability, 4 items for responsiveness, 5 items for assurance and 5 items to capture empathy. The questionnaire, which is designed to be administered in a face-to-face interview and requires a moderate to large size sample for statistical reliability, is lengthy and can take more than one hour to administer to reach respondent. In practice, researchers customarily add extra items to the 44 SERVQUAL items to capture information about the respondent's demographic profile, prior experience with the brand or category and behavioural intentions (intention to revisit/ repurchase, loyalty intentions and propensity to give word-of-mouth referrals). Thus, the final questionnaire may have up to 60 items, which contributes to substantial time and cost in terms of administration, coding and data analysis.

Summary of SERVQUAL questionnaire dimensions and items
Dimension	Definition	No. of items in questionnaire	Sample questionnaire items
Reliability	Ability to perform the promised service dependably and accurately	5	Expectations Item: When excellent telephone companies promise to do something by a certain time, they do so. Perceptions Item: XYZ company provides it services at the promised time.
Assurance	The knowledge and courtesy of employees and their ability to convey trust and confidence	5	Expectations Item: The behaviour of employees in excellent banks will instill confidence in customers. Perceptions Item: The behaviour of employees in the XYZ bank instils confidence in you.
Tangibles	Appearance of physical facilities, equipment, personnel and communication materials	4	Expectations Item: The physical facilities at excellent telephone will be visually pleasing. Perceptions Item: XYZ's physical facilities are visually pleasing.
Empathy	Provision of caring, individualized attention to customer	5	Expectations Item: Employees in excellent banks will understand the specific needs of their customers. Perceptions Item: XYZ employees understand my needs.
Responsiveness	Willingness to help customers and to provide prompt service	4	Expectations Item: Employees in excellent banks will tell customers exactly when services will be performed. Perceptions Item: Employees in the XYZ bank always tell me when they plan to deliver a service.

==== Performance-only model ====
Cronin and Taylor developed a scale based on perceived performance only (i.e. excluded expectations) as a simpler alternative to SERVQUAL. The scale is known as SERVPERF and is considerably shorter than SERVQUAL, and therefore easier and cheaper to administer. Results from the use of SERVPERF correlate well with SERVQUAL. This approach utilises a different conceptualisation of service quality, which can be represented by the equation:

SQ = P

where;

SQ is service quality
P is the individual's perceptions of given service delivery

Although SERVPERF has a number of advantages in terms of administration, it has attracted criticism. The performance only instrument lacks the diagnostic value of the SERVQUAL since it includes only one variable (P) compared to SERVQUAL's richer data with two variables (P and E). To illustrate, consider one source of quality related problems which occurs when customers have unrealistically high expectations. SERVQUAL has no problem detecting such problems, however, SERVPERF can never detect this problem because it does not capture expectations. When choosing an appropriate instrument for investigations into service quality, service marketers must weigh up the expediency of SERVPERF against the diagnostic power of SERVQUAL.

== Service-dominant logic ==
Service-dominant logic (SDL) is a new way of thinking about marketing, especially the goods versus services division and especially a fresh way of thinking about customer value and the value-creation process. Vargo and Lusch did not intend for service-dominant logic to be published as a workable theory that offers solutions to everyday marketing problems and issues. Instead, it offers a framework for thinking about goods and services. Their work did not put forward hypotheses that could be tested empirically, Instead they offer "foundational propositions". The original article offered eight such propositions and subsequently added two more propositions to arrive at a total of ten:

Some of the implications that have been identified in the literature include:

SDL promises a unified marketing theory: As of now, marketing research and practice have failed to integrate the traditional goods-services dichotomy. Some efforts have been made to get product accepted as a joint term for goods and services and package or solution as an all inclusive package consumers buy, but this has not been successful. Service-dominant logic, however, promises a unified framework. For many academics, this is an exciting implication. It is highly likely that the 4 Ps, as the central marketing framework, is about to come to a close.

Compete Through Innovative Co-production and Co-creation: Some theorists point out that, thanks largely to the Internet, consumers have been actively engaging themselves in explicit dialogue with manufacturers and service providers. The challenge is for service firms to find innovative ways to achieve co-production and co-creation. Customer co-creation has become the foundation concept for social sharing web sites such as YouTube, Myspace and Twitter. Many companies have moved from testing products in the contrived and artificial conditions of a laboratory to product testing in customer environments. At Microsoft, for example, consumers acted as product researchers by testing Windows 2000 in their native environments. A different approach is to use embedded intelligence to provide enhanced personalized experiences.

Research Priorities: SDL has forced the discipline to review its research priorities. Researchers and scholars are beginning to identify a range of subjects that require more detailed exploration. Some theorists have argued that marketing practitioners must find new ways of understanding customers' value creation and of developing marketing strategies with an aim to engage suppliers with their customers' consumption processes in order to enhance customer satisfaction. Other research priorities include: the personalized customer experience, resource integration, improved use of IT to map processes and activities in order to increase productivity and standardize service.

== See also ==
- Consumer behaviour
- Customer experience
- Destination marketing
- Industrialization of services business model
- Service blueprint
- Service design
- Service quality
- Service system
- Servicescapes
- Service-dominant logic
- Servitization of products business model
- SERVQUAL
