= Customer involvement management =

Customer involvement management, CIM, is a marketing management method that takes customer orientation further than customer relationship management. CIM identifies and develops ways to involve customers in the business and product development process, such as design, marketing, sales, customer service, etc. The degree of involvement can be as far as to make the customer a part of the product, experience, and delivery.

Within CIM, the product is considered a subset in what meets the customer's need of identification, problem solving, and consumption. The possibility to influence the design and the consumption itself is assumed to be of great importance for the customers buying decision and loyalty.

One example of a company that uses CIM is Nike. With the concept NikeiD they let the customers design their own sport shoes.

More recently companies have started to build Web portals that involve customers in the idea generation, selection, development, and commercialization.
