= SERVQUAL =

Service quality research tool

SERVQUAL is a research tool that measures customer perception of service quality by comparing what customers expect from a service to their assessment of the service actually delivered. The instrument was developed in the United States in the mid-1980s by researchers A. Parasuraman, Valarie Zeithaml, and Leonard L. Berry, and is designed for use in after-service evaluation processes. It assesses service quality across five dimensions: reliability, assurance, tangibles, empathy, and responsiveness. SERVQUAL has been applied in sectors including healthcare, banking, education, and libraries.

== Overview ==
The SERVQUAL questionnaire consists of matched pairs of items, 22 expectation items and 22 perception items, organized into five dimensions that correspond to the consumer's mental framework for evaluating service quality.

Each item is part of a pair: one question asks what excellent organizations in a given industry should offer (expectation), and the other asks how the specific organization being evaluated performs (perception).

SERVQUAL dimensions with sample items
| Dimension | Sample expectation item | Sample perception item |
|---|---|---|
| Reliability | When excellent telephone companies promise to do something by a certain time, they do so. | XYZ company provides its services at the promised time. |
| Assurance | The behaviour of employees in excellent banks will instil confidence in customers. | The behaviour of employees in the XYZ bank instils confidence in you. |
| Tangibles | Excellent telephone companies will have modern‑looking equipment. | XYZ company has modern‑looking equipment. |
| Empathy | Excellent banks will have operating hours convenient to customers. | XYZ bank has convenient operating hours. |
| Responsiveness | Employees of excellent telephone companies will never be too busy to help a customer. | XYZ employees are never too busy to help you. |

== The model of service quality ==
The model of service quality, referred to as the gaps model, was developed by Parasuraman, Zeithaml, and Berry during a systematic research program conducted in the 1980s. The model identifies five gaps that may cause customers to experience poor service quality.

In this framework, gap 5 is the service quality gap, which represents the difference between customer expectations and their perceptions of the service. This is the only gap that can be directly measured, and the SERVQUAL instrument was designed specifically to capture it. Gaps 1 through 4 have diagnostic value and point to probable causes of service failures.

Summary of gaps with diagnostic indications
| Gap | Description | Probable causes |
|---|---|---|
| Gap 1 The Knowledge Gap | Difference between the target market's expected service and management's perceptions of those expectations. | Insufficient marketing research; inadequate upward communication; too many layers of management. |
| Gap 2 The Standards Gap | Difference between management's perceptions of customer expectations and the translation into service procedures and specifications. | Lack of management commitment to service quality; employee perceptions of infeasibility; inadequate goal setting; inadequate task standardisation. |
| Gap 3 The Delivery Gap | Difference between service quality specifications and the service actually delivered. | Technical breakdowns or malfunctions; role conflict or ambiguity; lack of perceived control; poor employee‑job fit; poor technology fit; inadequate supervision or training. |
| Gap 4 The Communications Gap | Difference between service delivery intentions and what is communicated to the customer. | Lack of horizontal communications; poor communication with advertising agency; inadequate communications between sales and operations; differences in policies and procedures across branches or divisions; propensity to overpromise. |

== Development of the instrument ==
Development of the model of service quality began in 1983 and, after iterative refinements, led to the publication of the SERVQUAL instrument in 1988. The research team conducted in-depth interviews and focus groups in four service sectors: retail banking, credit card services, securities brokerage, and product repair and maintenance. The questionnaire was tested across multiple samples to verify its reliability, validity, and factor structure.

== Adaptations and variants ==
SERVQUAL has been adapted for specific industries and contexts. Well‑known derivatives include:

- LibQUAL+ – a library service quality survey developed by the Association of Research Libraries.
- EDUQUAL – an instrument tailored for the evaluation of service quality in educational institutions.
- HEALTHQUAL – adapted for measuring patient perceptions of healthcare service quality.
- ARTSQUAL – used to evaluate visitor perceptions of quality in museums and performing arts venues.

== Criticisms ==
Researchers have raised several concerns about SERVQUAL. Critics argue that the instrument's definition of expectations is ambiguous and that it does not adequately account for the dynamic nature of customer expectations over time. Other scholars question whether the five‑dimension structure is universally applicable across all service contexts, and whether a generic instrument can capture the unique attributes of specific industries without modification.

== See also ==
- Service quality
- Customer satisfaction
- Gap analysis
- Mystery shopping
