= History of marketing =

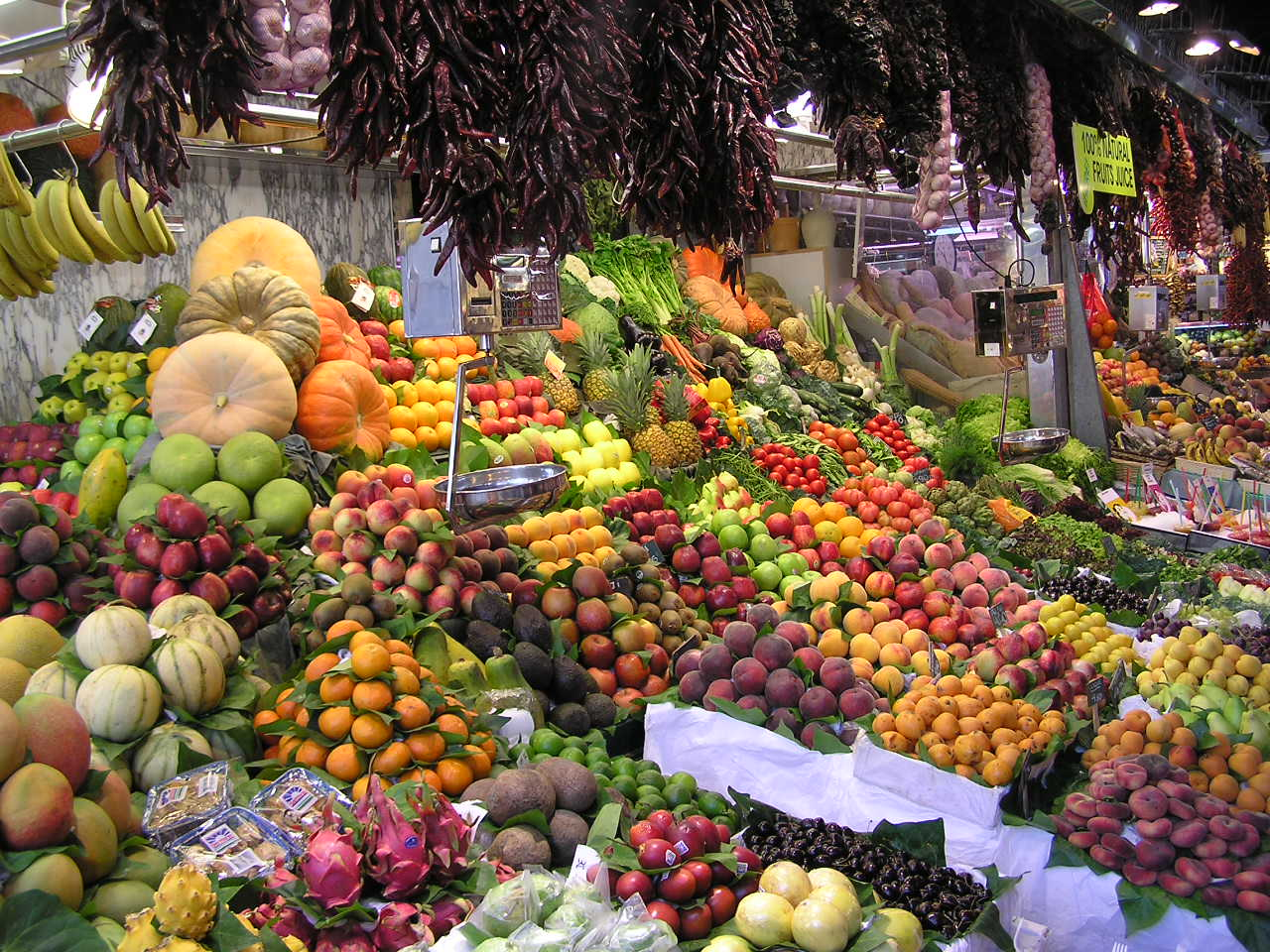
The term 'marketing' comes from the Latin, 'mercatus', meaning a marketplace. Pictured: La Boqueria, Barcelona, Spain

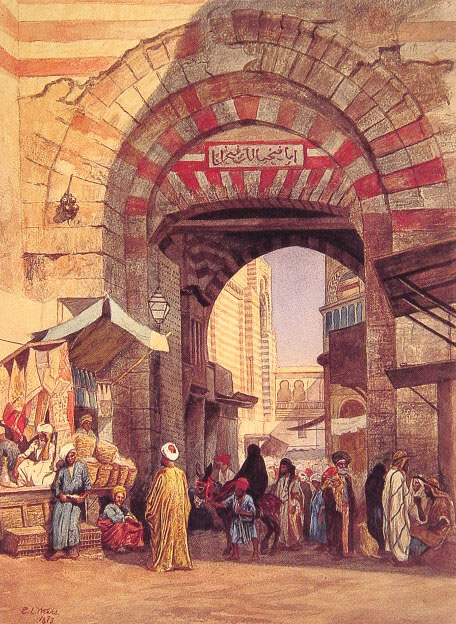
Scholars have found evidence of marketing practices in the marketplaces of antiquity. Pictured: The Moorish Bazaar, painting by Edwin Lord Weeks, 1873

The study of the history of marketing, as a discipline, is important because it helps to define the baselines upon which change can be recognised and understand how the discipline evolves in response to those changes. The practice of marketing has been known for millennia, but the term "marketing" used to describe commercial activities assisting the buying and selling of products or services came into popular use in the late nineteenth century. The study of the history of marketing as an academic field emerged in the early twentieth century.

Marketers tend to distinguish between the history of marketing practice and the history of marketing thought:

1. the history of marketing practice refers to an investigation into the ways that marketing has been practiced; and how those practices have evolved over time as they respond to changing socio-economic conditions
2. the history of marketing thought refers to an examination of the ways that marketing has been studied and taught

Although the history of marketing thought and the history of marketing practice are distinct fields of study, they intersect at different junctures.

Robert J. Keith's article "The Marketing Revolution", published in 1960, was a pioneering study of the history of marketing practice. In 1976, the publication of Robert Bartel's book, The History of Marketing Thought, marked a turning-point in the understanding of how marketing theory evolved since it first emerged as a separate discipline around the turn of last century.

== Etymology ==
According to etymologists, the term 'marketing' first appeared in dictionaries in the sixteenth century where it referred to the process of buying and selling at a market. The contemporary definition of 'marketing' as a process of moving goods from producer to consumer with an emphasis on sales and advertising first appeared in dictionaries in 1897. The term, marketing, is a derivation of the Latin word, mercatus meaning marketplace or merchant.

== Marketing history: an overview ==
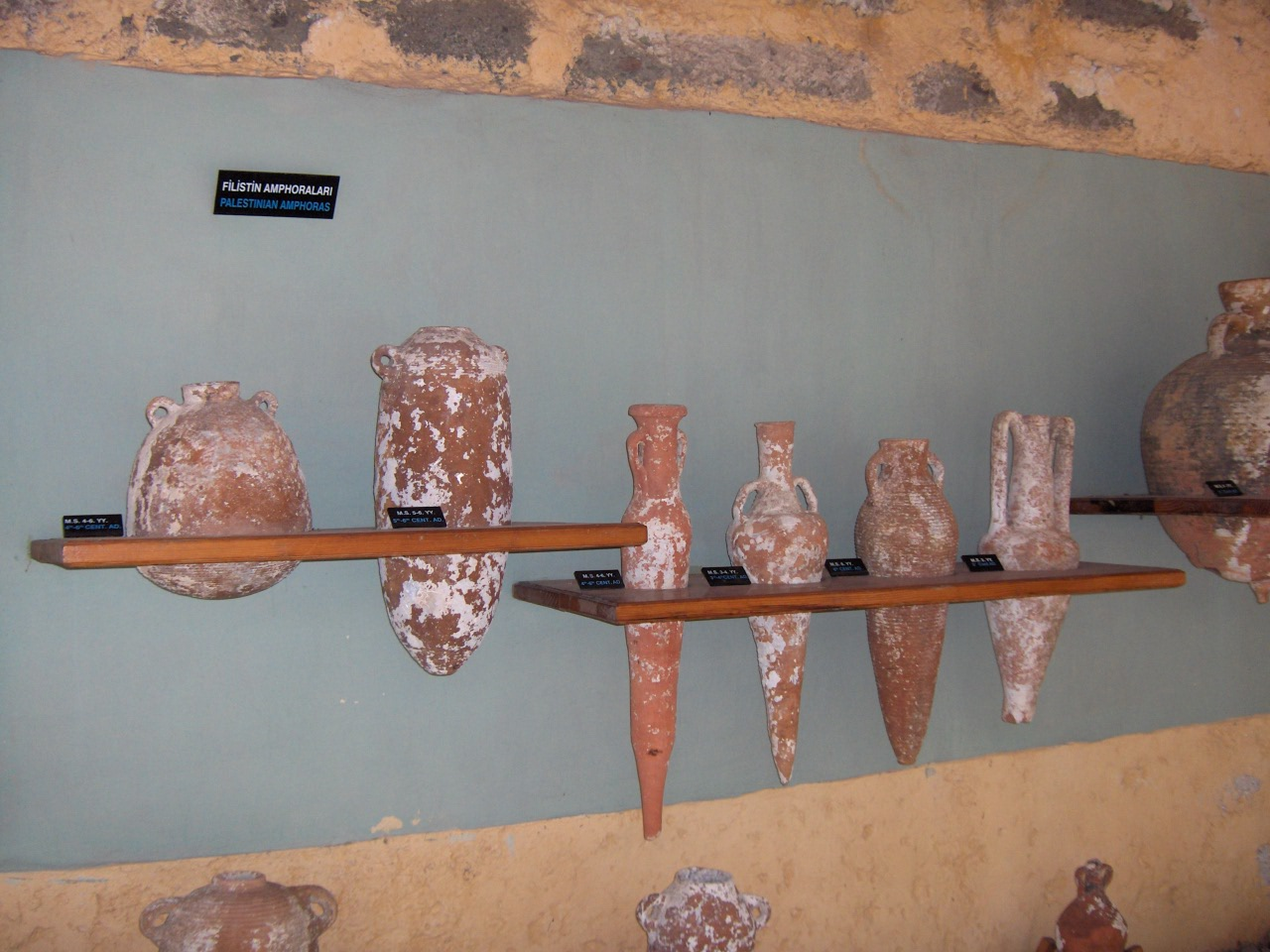
In pre-literate societies, the distinctive shape of amphora served some of the functions of a label, communicating information about region of origin, the name of the producer and may have carried product quality claims

Historians of marketing tend to fall into two branches of marketing history – the history of marketing practice and the history of marketing thought. These branches are often deeply divided and have very different roots. The history of marketing practice is grounded in the management and marketing disciplines, while the history of marketing thought is grounded in economic and cultural history. This means that the two branches ask very different types of research questions, and they employ different research tools and frameworks.

Historians of marketing have undertaken considerable investigation into the emergence of marketing practice, yet there is little agreement about when marketing first began. Some researchers argue that marketing practices can be found in antiquity while others suggest that marketing, in its modern form, emerged in conjunction with the rise of consumer culture in seventeenth and eighteenth century Europe while yet other researchers suggest that modern marketing was only fully realised in the decades following the Industrial Revolution in Britain from where it subsequently spread to Europe and North America. Hollander and others have suggested that the different dates for the emergence of marketing can be explained by problems surrounding the way that marketing has been defined – whether reference to 'modern marketing' as a planned, programmed repertoire of professional practice including activities such as segmentation, product differentiation, positioning and marketing communications versus 'marketing' as a simple form of distribution and exchange.

=== Marketing in antiquity ===
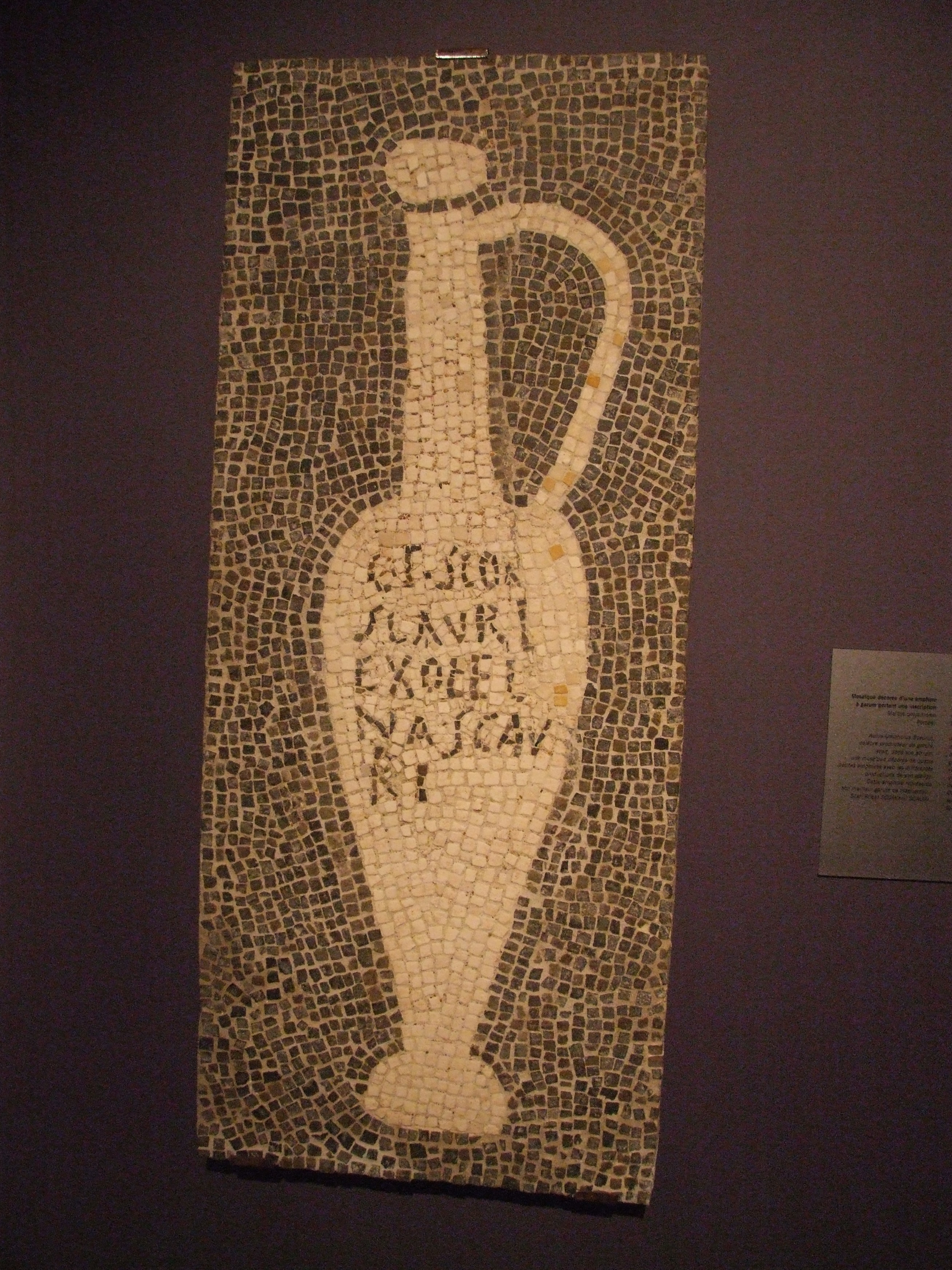
Mosaic showing garum container, from the house of Umbricius Scaurus of Pompeii. The inscription which reads "G(ari) F(los) SCO(mbri) SCAURI EX OFFI(CI)NA SCAURI" has been translated as "The flower of garum, made of the mackerel, a product of Scaurus, from the shop of Scaurus"

Studies have found evidence of advertising, branding, packaging and labelling in antiquity. Umbricius Scauras, for example, was a manufacturer of fish sauce (also known as garum) in Pompeii, circa 35 B.C. Mosaic patterns in the atrium of his house were decorated with images of amphora bearing his personal brand and quality claims. The mosaic comprises four different amphora, one at each corner of the atrium, and bearing labels as follows:

1. G(ari) F(los) SCO[m]/ SCAURI/ EX OFFI[ci]/NA SCAU/RI Translated as "The flower of garum, made of the mackerel, a product of Scaurus, from the shop of Scaurus"
2. LIQU[minis]/ FLOS Translated as: "The flower of Liquamen"
3. G[ari] F[los] SCOM[bri]/ SCAURI Translated as: "The flower of garum, made of the mackerel, a product of Scaurus"
4. LIQUAMEN/ OPTIMUM/ EX OFFICI[n]/A SCAURI Translated as: "The best liquamen, from the shop of Scaurus"

Scauras' fish sauce had a high reputation, not only in the Pompeii region; a garum container bearing his name has been found at Fos-sur-mer in southern France. Curtis has described this mosaic as "an advertisement... and a rare, unequivocal example of a motif inspired by a patron, rather than by the artist." In Pompeii and nearby Herculaneum, archaeological evidence also points to evidence of branding and labelling in relatively common use. Wine jars, for example, were stamped with names, such as "Lassius" and "L. Eumachius;" probably references to the name of the producer. Carbonised loaves of bread, found at Herculaneum, indicate that some bakers stamped their bread with the producer's name.

David Wengrow has argued that branding became necessary following the urban revolution in ancient Mesopotamia in the 4th century BCE, when large-scale economies started mass-producing commodities such as alcoholic drinks, cosmetics and textiles. These ancient societies imposed strict forms of quality control over commodities, and also needed to convey value to the consumer through branding. Producers began by attaching simple stone seals to products which over time were transformed into clay seals bearing impressed images, often associated with the producer's personal identity thus giving the product a personality.

Diana Twede has argued that the "consumer packaging functions of protection, utility and communication have been necessary whenever packages were the object of transactions" (p. 107). She has shown that amphoras used in Mediterranean trade between 1500 and 500 BCE exhibited a wide variety of shapes and markings, which provided information for transactions. Systematic use of stamped labels dates from around the fourth century BCE. In a largely pre-literate society, the shape of the amphora and its pictorial markings conveyed information about the contents, region of origin and even the identity of the producer which were understood to convey information about product quality. Not all historians agree that these markings can be compared with modern brands or labels. Moore and Reid, for example, have argued that the distinctive shapes and markings in ancient containers should be termed proto-brands rather than modern brands.

=== Marketing in the Middle Ages ===
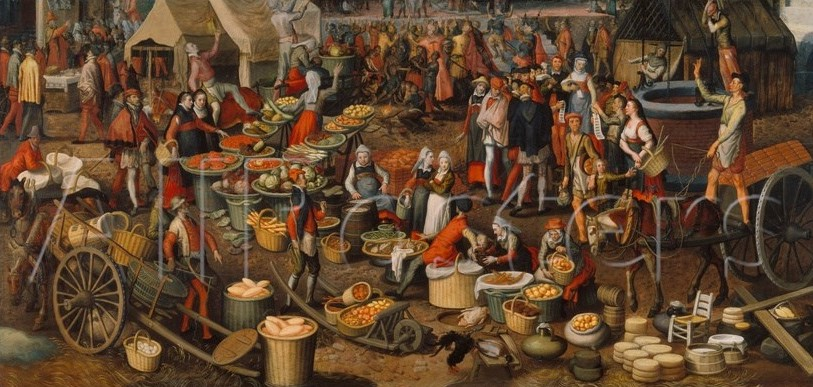
Market scene by Pieter Aertsen, c.1550

In England and continental Europe, market towns sprang up during the Middle Ages. Some analysts have suggested that the term 'marketing' may have first been used in the context of market towns, where it may have been used by producers to describe the process of carting and selling their produce and wares in market towns. Blintiff has investigated some early medieval networks of market towns, and suggests that by the 12th century there was an upsurge in the number of market towns, and an emergence of "merchant circuits" as traders bulked up surpluses from smaller regional, different day markets and resold them at the larger centralised market towns.

Braudel and Reynold have made a systematic study of these European market towns between the thirteenth and fifteenth century. Their investigation shows that in regional districts markets were held once or twice a week, while daily markets were more common in the larger cities and towns. Over time, permanent shops began to open daily and gradually supplanted the periodic markets. Peddlers filled in the distribution gaps by travelling door-to-door to sell produce and wares. The physical market was characterised by transactional exchange, bartering systems were commonplace and the economy was characterised by local trading. Braudel reports that, in 1600, goods travelled relatively short distances – grain 5–10 miles; cattle 40–70 miles; wool and wollen cloth 20–40 miles. However, following the European age of discovery, goods were imported from afar – calico cloth from India, porcelain, silk and tea from China, spices from India and South-East Asia and tobacco, sugar, rum and coffee from the New World.

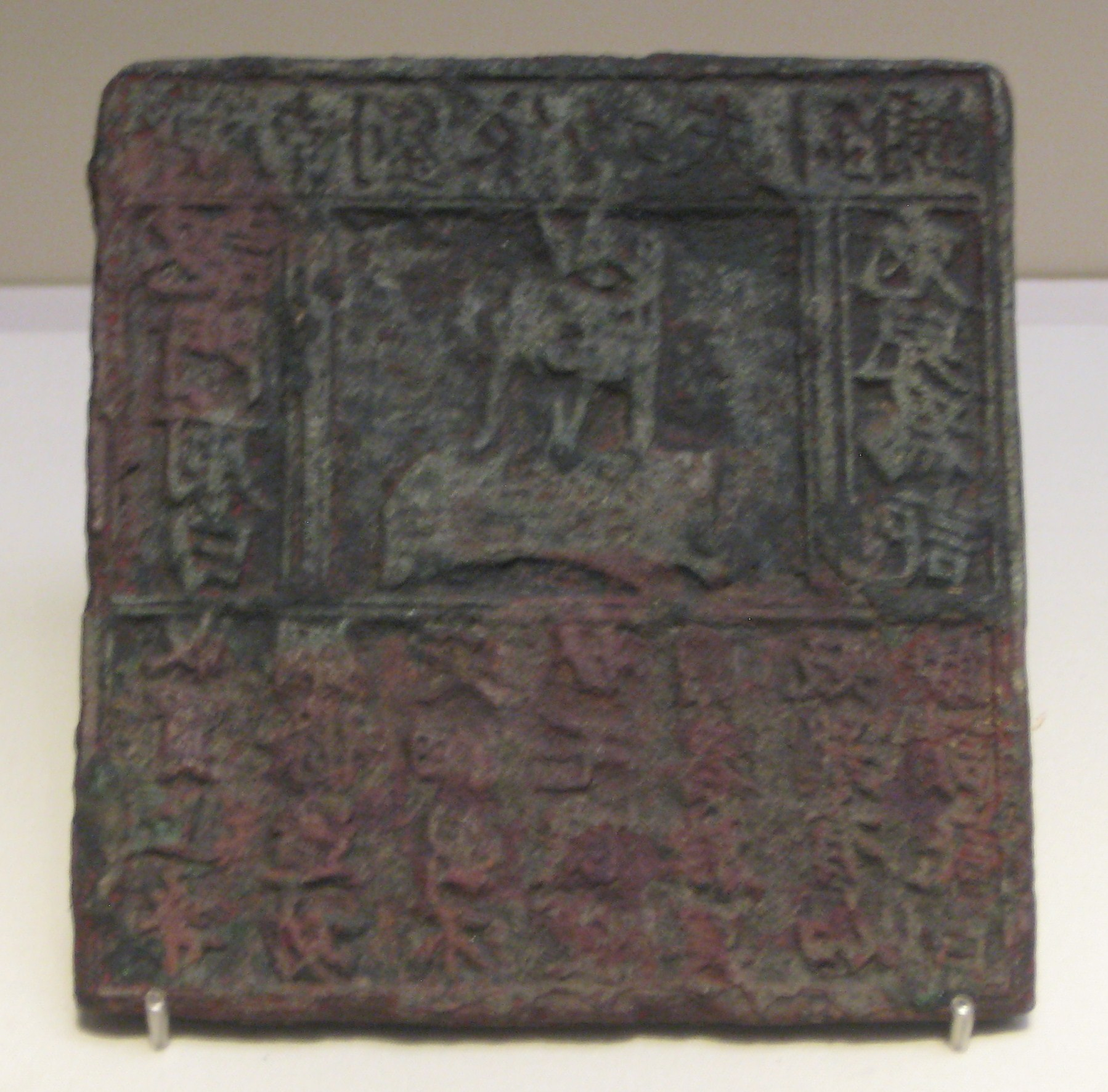
Bronze plate for printing an advertisement for the Liu family needle shop at Jinan, Song dynasty China. It is considered the world's earliest identified printed advertising medium.

Although the rise of consumer culture and marketing in Britain and Europe have been studied extensively, less is known about developments elsewhere. Nevertheless, recent research suggests that China exhibited a rich history of early marketing practices; including branding, packaging, advertising and retail signage. From as early as 200 BCE, Chinese packaging and branding was used to signal family, place names and product quality, and the use of government imposed product branding was used between 600 and 900 AD. Eckhart and Bengtsson have argued that during the Song dynasty (960–1127), Chinese society developed a consumerist culture, where a high level of consumption was attainable for a wide variety of ordinary consumers rather than just the elite (p. 212). The rise of a consumer culture led to the commercial investment in carefully managed company image, retail signage, symbolic brands, trademark protection and the brand concepts of baoji, hao, lei, gongpin, piazi and pinpai, which roughly equate with Western concepts of family status, quality grading, and upholding traditional Chinese values (p. 219). Eckhardt and Bengtsson's analysis suggests that brands emerged in China as a result of the social needs and tensions implicit in consumer culture, in which brands provide social status and stratification. Thus, the evolution of brands in China stands in sharp contrast to the West where manufacturers pushed brands onto the market in order to differentiate, increase market share and ultimately profits (pp 218–219).

=== Marketing in seventeenth and eighteenth century Europe ===
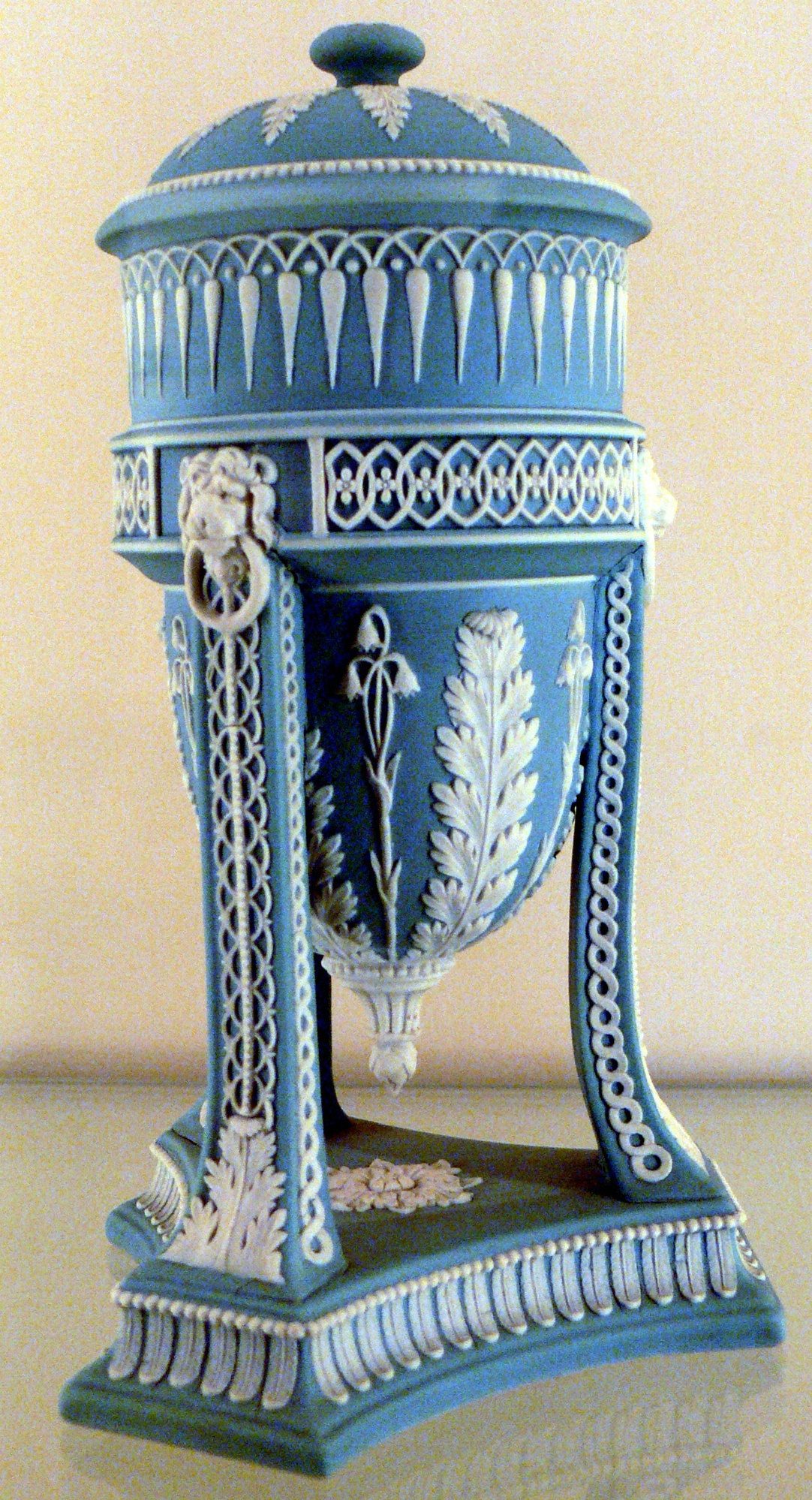
Josiah Wedgewood (1730–1795) invented many of the techniques of modern marketing

Scholars have identified specific instances of marketing practices in England and Europe in the seventeenth and eighteenth centuries. As trade between countries or regions grew, companies required information on which to base business decisions. Individuals and companies carried out formal and informal research on trade conditions. As early as 1380, Johann Fugger travelled from Augsburg to Graben in order to gather information on the international textile industry. He exchanged detailed letters on trade conditions in relevant areas. In the early 1700s British industrial houses were demanding information, that could be used for business decisions. In the early 18th-century, Daniel Defoe, a London merchant, published information on trade and economic resources of England and Scotland. Defoe was a prolific publisher and among his many publications are titles devoted to trade including; Trade of Britain Stated, 1707; Trade of Scotland with France, 1713 and The Trade to India Critically and Calmly Considered, 1720; all books that were highly popular with merchants and business houses of the period. While such activities might now be recognised as marketing research, at that time they were known as "commercial research" or "commercial intelligence" and not seen as part of the repertoire of activities that make up contemporary marketing practice.

Eighteenth century advertising showed a high level of sophistication in its execution and ability to reach mass audiences. In a major review of consumer society, McKendrick, Brewer and Plumb found extensive evidence of eighteenth century English entrepreneurs inventing modern marketing techniques, including product differentiation; sales promotion; loss leader; planned obsolescence; fashion magazines; national advertising campaigns, fancy showrooms, and concentration on elite taste-setting customers. English pottery makers Josiah Wedgewood (1730–1795) and Matthew Boulton (1728–1809) were the pioneers of modern mass marketing methods. Wedgewood introduced direct mail, travelling salesmen and catalogues in the eighteenth century. Wedgewood's marketing was highly sophisticated and recognisably 'modern' in that he planned production with the sale in mind. He carried out serious investigations into the fixed and variable costs of production and recognised that increased production would lead to lower unit costs. He also inferred that selling at lower prices would lead to higher demand and recognised the value of achieving scale economies in production. By cutting costs and lowering prices, Wedgewood was able to generate higher overall profits. Similarly, one of Wedgewood's colleagues Matthew Boulton, pioneered early mass production techniques and product differentiation at his Soho Manufactory in the 1760s. He also practiced planned obsolescence and understood the importance of 'celebrity marketing' – that is supplying the nobility, often at prices below cost and of obtaining royal patronage, for the sake of the publicity and cudos generated.

Fullerton argues that the practice of market segmentation emerged well before marketers used the notion formally. Certain strands of evidence suggest that simple examples of market segmentation were evident prior to the 1880s. The business historian, Richard S. Tedlow, argues that any attempt to segment markets prior to 1880 was highly fragmented since the economy was characterised by small, regional suppliers who mostly sold goods on a local or regional basis. When retail shops began to appear from the 15th century, retailers needed to separate the "riff raff" from wealthier customers. Outside the major metropolitan cities, few stores could afford to serve one type of clientele exclusively. However, gradually retail shops introduced innovations that would allow them to separate wealthier customers from the lower classes and peasants. One technique was to have a window opening out onto the street from which customers could be served. This allowed the sale of goods to the common people, without encouraging them to come inside. Another solution, that came into vogue from the late sixteenth century was to invite favoured customers into a back-room of the store, where goods were permanently on display. Yet another technique that emerged around the same time was to hold a showcase of goods in the shopkeeper's private home for the benefit of wealthier clients. Samuel Pepys, for example, writing in 1660, describes being invited to the home of a retailer to view a wooden jack. Evidence of early marketing segmentation has also been noted across Europe. A study of the German book trade found examples of both product differentiation and market segmentation in the 1820s.

=== Marketing in the nineteenth and twentieth centuries ===
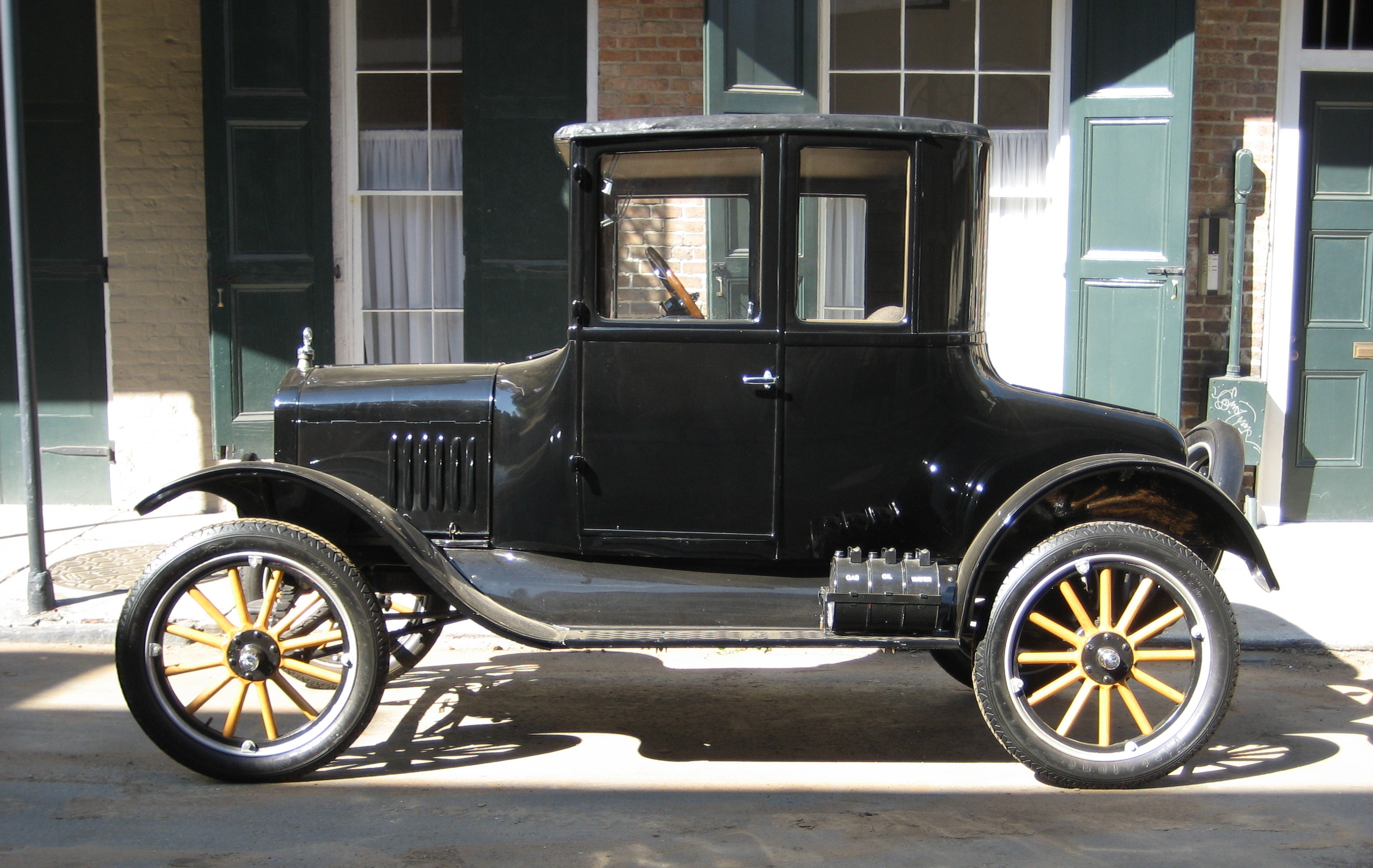
Henry Ford began manufacturing the mass-produced Model T in 1908. Ford famously said that customers could own a car in any colour as long as it was black.

Until the nineteenth century, Western economies were characterised by small regional suppliers who sold goods on a local or regional basis. However, as transportation systems improved from the mid nineteenth century, the economy became more unified allowing companies to distribute standardised, branded goods at national level. This gave rise to a broader mass marketing mindset. Manufacturers tended to insist on strict standardisation to achieve scale economies with a view to keeping production costs down and also to achieving market penetration in the early stages of a product's life cycle. The Model T Ford was an example of a product being manufactured at a price that was affordable for the burgeoning middle classes.

In the early twentieth century, as market size increased, it became more commonplace for manufacturers to produce a variety of models pitched at different quality points designed to meet the needs of various demographic and lifestyle market segments, giving rise to the widespread practice of market segmentation and product differentation. Between 1902 -1910 George B Waldron, used tax registers, city directories and census data to show advertisers the proportion of educated versus illiterate consumers and the earning capacity of different occupations in what is believed to be the first example of demographic segmentation of a population. Within little more than a decade, Paul Cherington had developed the 'ABCD' household typology - the first socio-demographic segmentation tool. By the 1930s, market researchers Ernest Dichter were carrying out qualitative research into brand purchasers realised that demographic factors alone were insufficient to explain different marketing behaviour of various user groups. This insight led to the exploration of other factors such as lifestyles, values, attitudes and beliefs in market segmentation and advertising.

When Wendell R. Smith published his article, Product Differentiation and Market Segmentation as Alternative Marketing Strategies in 1956, he noted that he was simply documenting marketing practices that had been observed for some time and which he described as a "natural force". Other theorists agree that Smith was simply codifying implicit knowledge that had been used in marketing and brand management from the early twentieth century.

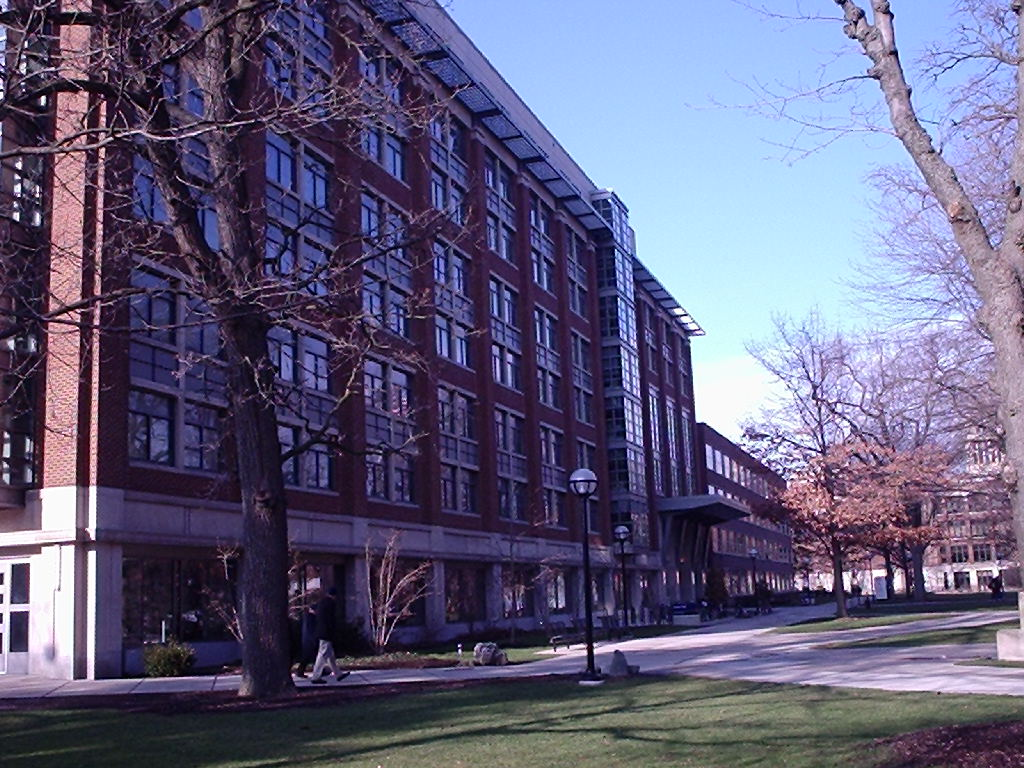
Haven-Mason Hall at the University of Michigan, where the first academic course in marketing was taught

As industry grew, the demand for skilled business professionals also grew. To meet this demand, universities began offering courses in commerce, economics and marketing. Marketing, as a discipline, was first taught in universities in the very early twentieth century. However, researchers only became interested in investigating the history of marketing in the mid twentieth century. From the outset, researchers tended to identify two strands of historical research; the history of marketing practice and the history of marketing thought which was fundamentally concerned with the rise of marketing education and dissecting the way that marketing was taught and studied.

== History of marketing practice ==
The practice of marketing may have been carried out for millennia, but the modern concept of marketing as a professional practice appears to have emerged the post industrial corporate world. In addition to the studies of specific cultures or time periods, discussed in the preceding section, some historians of marketing have sought to write more general histories of marketing's evolution in the modern era. A key question that has preoccupied researchers is whether it is possible to identify specific orientations or mindsets that inform key periods in marketing's evolution. Marketers disagree about the way that marketing practice has evolved over time.

=== Orientations and philosophies ===
In the marketing literature, continuing debate surrounds the orientations or philosophies that might have informed marketing practice at different periods of time. An orientation may be defined as "the type of activity or subject that an organisation seems most interested in and gives most attention to". In relation to marketing orientations, the term can be defined as a "philosophy of business management". or "a corporate state of mind" or as an "organisational culture".

=== Common periods ===
The general agreement amongst scholars as to what constitutes clearly identifiable periods and the orientation that characterised each distinct period has spawned a lengthy list of orientations. Space prevents an exhaustive description of all periods or eras. However, the salient features of the most commonly cited periods appear in the following section.

==== Production orientation ====
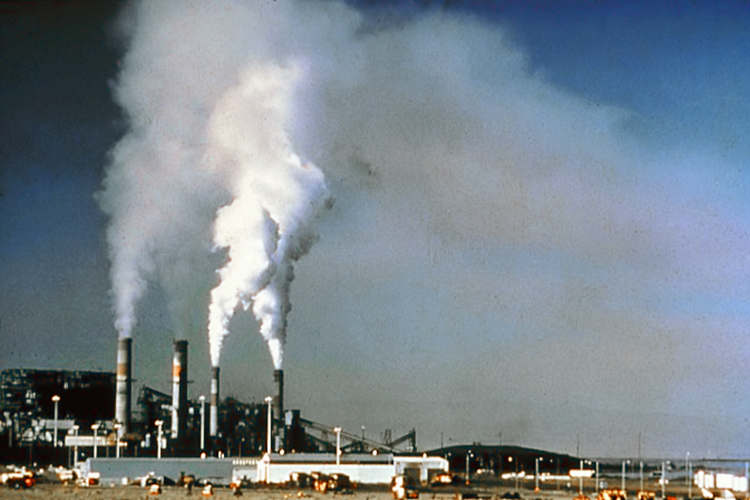
The production orientation is one of the oldest philosophies that guides sellers

A production orientation is often proposed as the first of the orientations that dominated business thought. Keith dated the production era from the 1860s to the 1930s, but other theorists argue that evidence of the production orientation can still be found in some companies or industries. Specifically Kotler and Armstrong note that the production philosophy is "one of the oldest philosophies that guides sellers" and "is still useful in some situations".

The production orientation is characterised by:

- Focus on production, manufacturing, and efficiency
- Attainment of economies of scale, economies of scope, experience effects or all three
- Assumption that demand exceeds supply
- Mindset that is encapsulated by Say's law; "Supply creates its own demand" or "if somebody makes a product, somebody else will want to buy it"
- Limited research that is largely limited to technical-product research rather than customer research
- Rose to prominence in an environment which had a shortage of manufactured goods relative to demand, so goods sold easily.
- Minimal promotion and advertising, marketing communications limited to raising awareness of the product's existence

==== Selling orientation ====
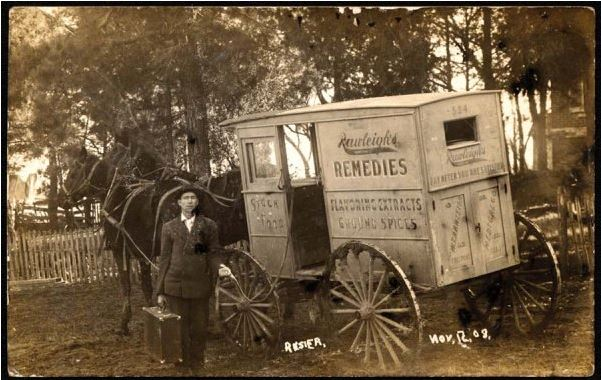
The sales orientation, often characterised by door-to-door selling is thought to have begun during the Great Depression of the 1890s and continues to this day. Pictured: A Rawleigh's salesman in 1915

The selling orientation is thought to have begun during the Great Depression and continued well into the 1950s although examples of this orientation can still be found today. Kotler et al. note that the selling concept "is typically practised with unsought goods".

The selling orientation is characterised by:

- Aggressive selling to push products, often involving door-to-door selling
- Accepting every possible sale or booking, regardless of its suitability for the business
- Strong transactional focus (ignores potential relationships)

==== Marketing orientation ====
The marketing orientation or the marketing concept emerged in the 1950s.

Characteristics of the marketing orientation:

- Thorough understanding of the customer's needs, wants and behaviors should be the focal point of all marketing decisions
- Marketing efforts (sales, advertising, product management, pricing) should be integrated and in tune with the customer
- New product concepts should flow from extensive market analysis and product testing

==== Societal marketing concept ====
Phillip Kotler is credited with first proposing the societal marketing orientation or concept in an article published in the Harvard Business Review in 1972. However, some marketing historians, notably Wilkie and Moore, have argued that a societal perspective was evident in marketing theory and in marketing texts, since the discipline's inception in the early 1900s or that societal marketing is merely an extension of the marketing concept.

The societal marketing concept adopts the position that marketers have a greater social responsibility than simply satisfying customers and providing them with superior value. Instead, marketing activities should benefit society's overall well-being. Marketing organisations that have embraced the societal marketing concept typically identify key stakeholder groups including: employees, customers, local communities, the wider public and government and consider the impact of their activities on all stakeholders. They ensure that marketing activities do not damage the environment and are not hazardous to broader society. Societal marketing developed into sustainable marketing.

Characteristics of societal marketing:

- An attempt to balance corporate commitments to groups and individuals in its environment, including customers, other businesses, employees and investors.
- Companies must include social and ethical considerations into their marketing practices
- Consideration is given to the environment includes problems such as air, water, and land pollution
- Consideration is given to consumer rights, unfair pricing and ethics in advertising

==== Relationship orientation ====
Starting in the 1990s, a new stage of marketing emerged called relationship marketing. The focus of relationship marketing is on a long-term relationship that benefits both the company and the customer. The relationship is based on trust and commitment, and both companies tend to shift their operating activities to be able to work more efficiently together. One of the reasons for relationship marketing comes from Kotler's idea that it costs about five times more to obtain a new customer than to maintain the relationship with an existing customer. A relationship marketing approach seeks to maximise the value of all the potential exchanges an organisation could have into the future.

The characteristics of relationship marketing include:

- Focus on the relationship between seller and buyer
- Investment in the lifetime of relationships rather than single transactions by calculating customer lifetime value (CLV)
- Orientation on product benefits and/or customer value
- Better customer service, commitment, and contact
- Quality is the concern of all
- All activities are coordinated with the customer interface, including the customer's involvement in the firm's processes
- Customised offerings where practical

Empirical support for relationship marketing as a distinct paradigm is relatively weak. One study suggests that relationship marketing is a sub-component of large scale movements of the value-added process rather than a separate era or framework. Some theorists suggest that marketing is moving from a relationship marketing paradigm and towards a social media paradigm where marketers have access to a more controlled environment and are able to customise offers and communications messages.

=== Periodisations ===
To investigate the history of marketing practice, scholars often turn to a method known as periodisation. Periodisation refers to the process or study of categorizing the past into discrete, quantified, named units for the purpose of analysis or study. Scholars do not all agree on the periods that characterise the history of marketing practice. In a major review of the periodisation approach, Hollander et al. have identified fourteen different "stage theories" or "short periodisations" as well as a total of nineteen "long periodisations" that have been carried out since 1957. Of these, the contributions of Robert Keith (1960) and Ronald Fullerton (1988) are the most frequently cited.

==== Keith's periodisation ====
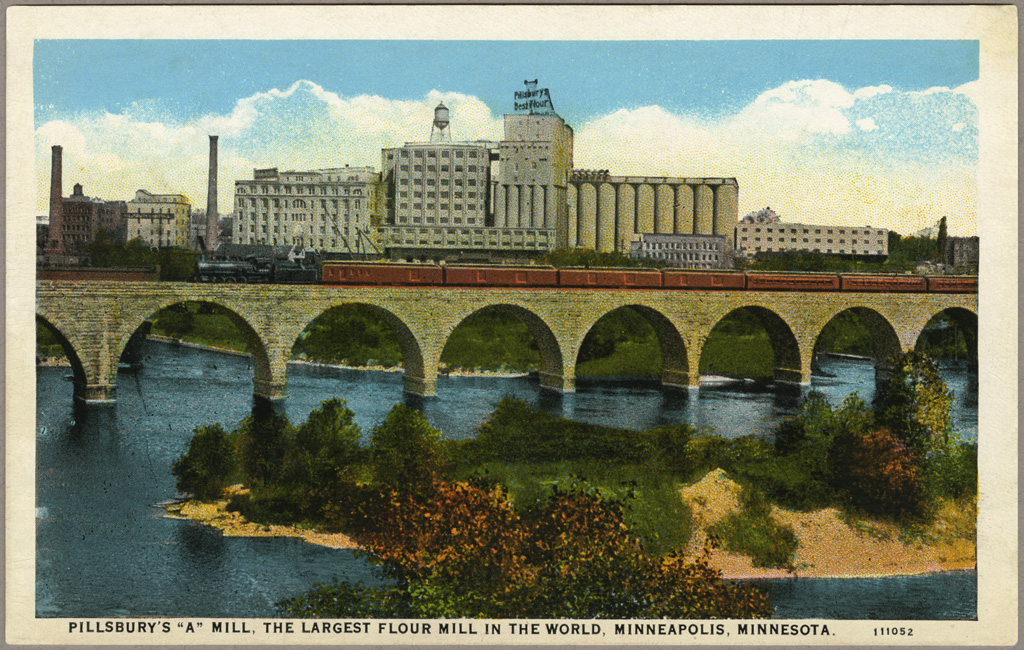
Robert Keith's marketing eras (production →selling →marketing) were based entirely on his experience at the Pillsbury Company

In 1960, Robert J. Keith, the then Vice President of Pillsbury, set the stage for decades of controversy when he published an article entitled the "Marketing Revolution" in which he set out the way that the Pillsbury Company had shifted from a focus on production in the 1860s through to a consumer focus in the 1950s. He traced three distinct eras in Pillsbury's evolution:

- Production-oriented era (1869–1930s): characterised by a "focus on production processes"
- Sales-oriented era (1930s–1950s): characterised by investment in research to develop new products and advertising to persuade markets of product benefits
- Marketing-oriented era (1950s–present): characterised by a focus on the customer's latent and existing needs

In addition, Keith hypothesised that a "marketing control era" was about to emerge. Although Keith's article explicitly documented Pillsbury's evolution, the article appears to suggest that the stages observed at Pillsbury constitute a standard or normal evolutionary path (production→sales→marketing) for most large organisations.

Keith's notion of distinct eras in the evolution of marketing practice has been widely criticised and his periodisation described as "hopelessly flawed". Specific criticisms of Keith's tripartite periodisation include that:

- It ignores historical facts about business conditions
- It misstates the nature of supply and demand
- It slights the growth of marketing institutions

The article, which is based on Keith's personal recollections and did not use a single reference, is best described as anecdotal. Systematic studies carried out since Keith's work have failed to replicate Keith's periodisation. Instead, other studies suggest that companies exhibited a marketing orientation in the 19th century and that the business schools were teaching marketing decades before Pillsbury adopted a marketing-oriented approach. Jones and Richardson also investigated historical accounts of marketing practice and found evidence for both the sales and marketing era during the so-called production era and concluded that the idea of a "marketing revolution" was a myth. A detailed study of the chocolate manufacturer, Rowntree, found that this company had shifted from a production orientation through to a marketing orientation by the 1930s, without having transitioned through the so-called sales orientation. Other critiques of Keith's work have pointed out that the so-called "production era" fails to align with historical facts and have also suggested that it is a myth. Keith's eras have become known, somewhat cynically, as the standard chronology.

==== Fullerton's periodisation ====
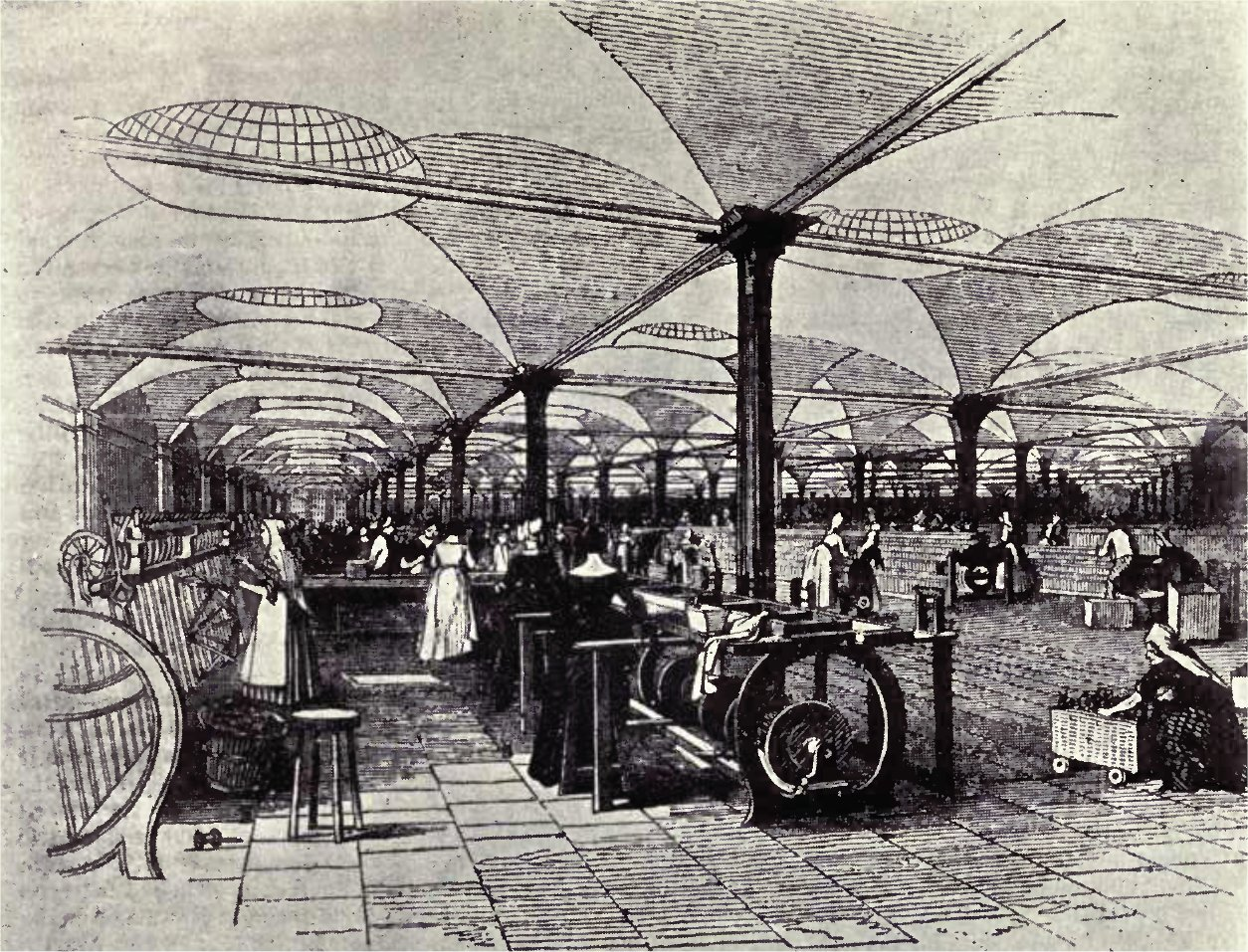
The English industrial revolution is often seen as a trigger for the rise of modern marketing

In 1988, Fullerton developed a more subtle and nuanced periodisation for the so-called marketing eras. Fullerton's eras were:

- Era of antecedents (1500–1750): a long gestational period in which people were largely self-sufficient and rural; economy characterised by low levels of consumption; commerce was seen as suspicious
- Era of origins (1750–1870): precipitated by the dislocations of the English industrial revolution and the rise of a more urban population, this era is characterised by more attention to persuasive tactics designed to stimulate demand
- Era of institutional development (1850–1929): many of the large institutions and modern marketing practices emerged during this period
- Era of refinement and formalization (1930–present): further development and refinement of principles and practices developed in the preceding period

In spite of the intense criticism leveled at Keith's eras of marketing practice, his periodisation is the most frequently cited in textbooks and has become the accepted wisdom. One content analysis of 25 introductory and advanced texts found that Keith's eras were reproduced in all but four. Another study, which examined 15 of the top selling marketing texts, found that the although the incidence of repeating Keith's eras was waning, it had not been replaced by Fullerton's periodisation, nor any other more meaningful framework.

==== Other periodisations ====
For all the controversies surrounding marketing stages or periods, Keith and others appear to have contributed a lasting legacy. A study by Grundey (2010) suggests that many contemporary textbooks begin with Keith's eras and expand on it by including newer concepts such as the societal marketing concept, the relationship marketing concept and the interfunctional concept, as shown in the table below. More recently, Kotler and Keller added the holistic marketing concept to the list of eras in marketing. Marketing theorists continue to debate whether the holistic era represents a genuine new orientation or whether it is an extension of the marketing concept. Grundey summarised five different periodisations in the history of marketing, as shown in the following table, as a means of highlighting the general lack of agreement among scholars.

Marketing philosophies or orientations in popular texts
Dibb & Simkin, 2004	Lancaster & Reynolds, 2005	Blythe, 2005	Drummond & Ensor, 2005	Morgan, 1996
1. Production orientation	1. Production orientation	1. Production orientation	1. Production orientation	1. Cost philosophy
2. Financial orientation	2. Sales orientation	2. Product orientation	2. Product orientation	2. Product philosophy
3. Sales orientation	3. Marketing orientation	3. Sales orientation	3. Sales orientation	3. Production philosophy
4. Marketing orientation		4. Customer orientation	4. Financial orientation	4. Sales philosophy
5. Customer orientation		5. Societal marketing	5. Marketing orientation	5. Erratic philosophy
6. Competitor orientation		6. Relationship orientation		6. Marketing philosophy
7. Interfunctional orientation				7. Social marketing philosophy

== History of marketing thought ==
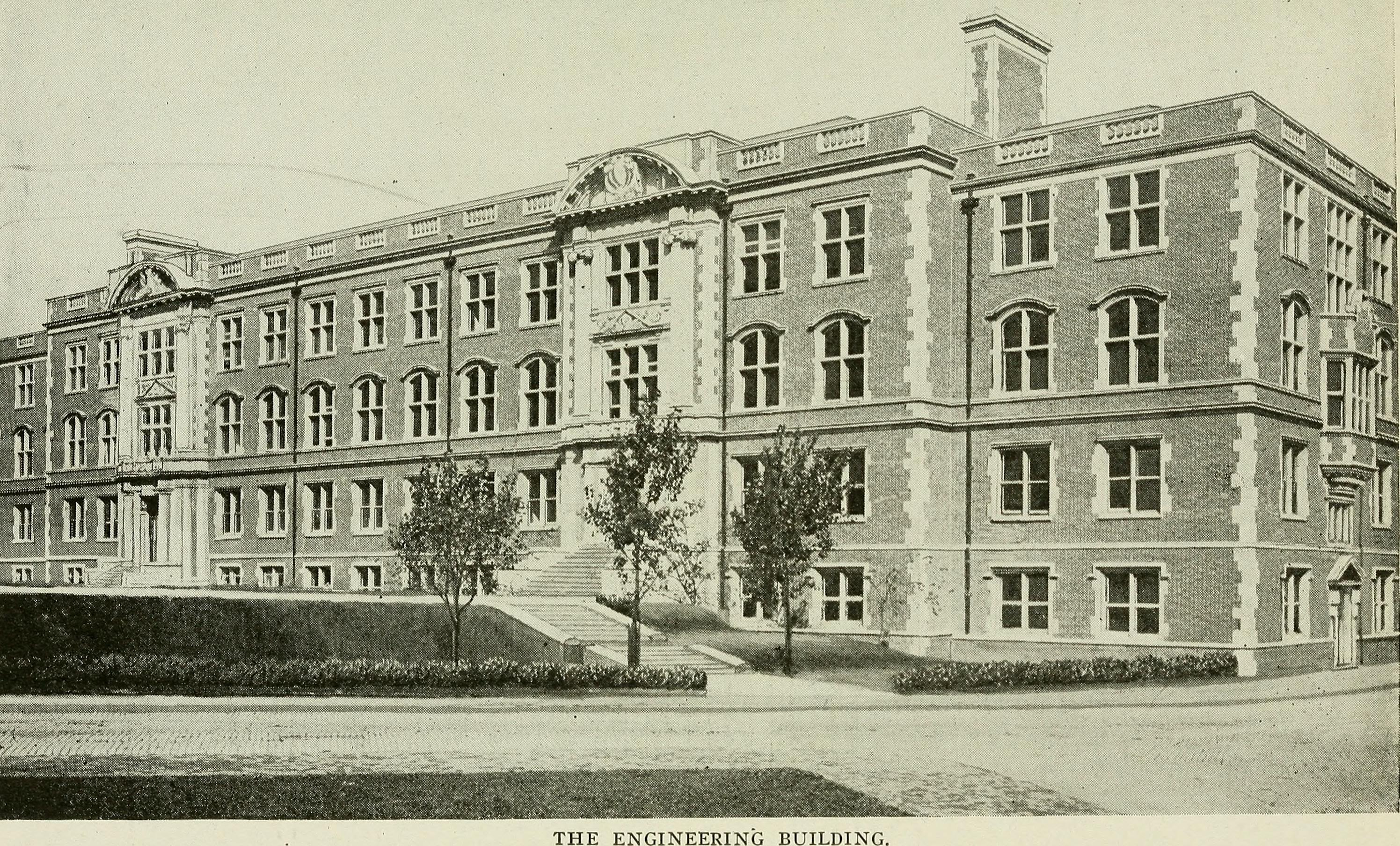
University of Pennsylvania was among the first universities to offer courses in marketing

Dating the history of marketing, as an academic discipline, is just as problematic as the history of marketing practice. Marketing historians cannot agree on how to date the beginnings of marketing thought. Eric Shaw, for instance, suggests that a period of pre-academic marketing thought can be identified prior to 1900. Other historians suggest that the theory of marketing only emerged in the 20th century when the discipline began to offer courses at universities. Nevertheless, the birth of marketing as a discipline is usually designated to the first decade of the twentieth century when "marketing courses" appeared in universities. In 1902, the University of Michigan offered what many believe to be the very first course in marketing. The University of Illinois also started offering coursework in marketing in 1902. In the academic year, 1904–1905, the University of Pennsylvania commenced teaching marketing. Other universities soon followed, including the Harvard Business School. In 1914 Harvard's required course "Economic Resources of the United States" was renamed "Marketing."

Prior to the emergence of marketing courses, marketing was not recognised as a discipline in its own right; rather it was treated as a branch of economics and was often called applied economics. Subjects, which today might be recognised as marketing-related, were embedded in economics courses. Early marketing theories were described as modifications or adaptations of economic theories.

The impetus for the separation of marketing and economics was due, at least in part, to economic's focus on production as the creator of economic value and general failure to investigate distribution. In the late 19th century and early 20th century, as markets became more globalised, distribution began to assume increasing importance. Some economics professors began to run courses examining various aspects of the marketing system, including "distributive and regulative systems." Other courses, such as the "marketing of products" and the "marketing of farm-products" followed. As the first decades of the 20th century progressed, books and articles concerning marketing topics began to emerge. In 1936, the publication of the new Journal of Marketing gave marketing academics a forum for exchanging ideas and research methods and also gave the discipline a real sense of its own distinct identity as a maturing academic discipline.

=== A periodisation approach ===
Several scholars have attempted to describe the evolution of marketing thought chronologically and to connect it with broader intellectual and academic trends. Bartels (1965) provided a brief account of marketing's formative periods, and Shah and Gardner (1982) briefly considered the development of the six dominant schools in contemporary marketing. However, these initial attempts have been criticised as overly descriptive. One of the first theorists to consider the stages in the development of marketing thought was Robert Bartels, who in The History of Marketing Thought, (1965) used a periodisation approach. He categorised the development of marketing theory decade by decade from the beginning of the 20th century:

- 1900s: discovery of basic concepts and their exploration
- 1910s: conceptualisation, classification and definition of terms
- 1920s: integration on the basis of principles
- 1930s: development of specialisation and variation in theory
- 1940s: reappraisal in the light of new demands and a more scientific approach
- 1950s: reconceptualisation in the light of managerialism, social development and quantitative approaches
- 1960s: differentiation on bases such as managerialism, holism, environmentalism, systems, and internationalism
- 1970s: socialisation; the adaptation of marketing to social change

Bartels was the first historian to provide a "long view of marketing’s past and wide sweep of its subdisciplines" and in so doing, he nurtured an interest in the history of marketing thought.

=== A 'schools of thought' approach ===
Other marketing historians have eschewed the periodisation approach, and instead considered whether distinct schools within marketing reflect different facets of common theory and whether a more unifying intellectual structure has emerged. These approaches tend to identify distinct schools of thought. A school of thought refers to an intellectual tradition or a group of scholars who share a common philosophy or set of ideas. Marketing historians, Shaw and Jones, define a school of thought as one that has "a substantial body of knowledge; developed by a number of scholars; and describing at least one aspect of the what, how, who, why, when and where of performing marketing activities."

To a certain extent, there is some agreement that in early marketing thought, three so-called traditional schools, namely the commodity school, the functional school and the institutional school co-existed. Marketing historians such as Eric Shaw and Barton A. Weitz point to the publication of Wroe Alderson's book, Marketing Behavior and Executive Action (1957), as a break-point in the history of marketing thought, moving from the macro functions-institutions-commodities approach to a micromarketing management paradigm. Following on from Alderson, marketing began to incorporate other fields of knowledge besides economics, notably behavioral science and psychology, becoming a multi-disciplinary field. For many scholars, Alderson's book marks the beginning of the Marketing Management Era. Of those historians who identify schools, there is no real agreement about which schools were dominant at different stages in marketing's development. Although the distinctive features of these schools can be identified and described, many of the early text-books included elements drawn from two or more schools of thought- for example, in a series of chapters devoted to commodities followed by a series of chapters devoted to the institutional and functional schools.

In the following section, a brief overview of the contributions of key thinkers will be outlined with respect to the prevailing schools that have dominated marketing thought.

Hunt and Goolsby, identified four schools of thought that have dominated marketing, namely; the commodity school, the institutional school, the functional school and the managerial school.

- The Commodity School: A focus on different types of goods in the marketplace and how they are marketed.
- The Institutional School: Emphasised the functions of middlemen (or intermediaries); similar to the functional school, but with a focus on channel flows.
- The Functional School: A focus on the characteristics of marketing, identifying the functions and systems of marketing; adopts a systems approach.
- The Managerial School: A focus on the problems faced by marketing managers; focuses on the perspective of the seller.

Some marketing historians like Jagdish Sheth have identified the modern "marketing schools" as:

- The Managerial school emerged during the late 1950s and became arguably the predominant and most influential school of thought in the field
- The Consumer/buyer behavior school, which dominated the academic field in the second half of the twentieth century (apart from the Managerial school), features theories emerging from behavioral science
- The Social exchange school, which focuses on exchange as the fundamental concept of marketing

Yet other commentators identify a broader range of schools. O'Malley and Lichrou, for example, document the schools as:

- Functional: What activities does marketing perform? Focus on intermediaries and value adding.
- Commodities: How are goods classified? Focus on classification of goods; trade flows
- Marketing Institutions: Who performs marketing functions on commodities? Focus on retailers, wholesalers, intermediaries, distribution channels
- Marketing Management: How should marketers and managers market products and services to consumers? Business firm as seller/ supplier
- Marketing Systems: What is a marketing system and how does it work? Channels of distribution and aggregate systems,
- Consumer behaviour: How and why do consumers buy? organisational buyer and consumer buyer
- Macro-marketing: How do marketing systems impact on society? Industries, channels, consumer movement, environmentalism
- Exchange: What are the forms of exchange? Who are the parties to the exchange process? Aggregations of buyers and sellers
- Marketing history: When did marketing practice and ideas emerge and evolve? Marketing thought and marketing practice

=== Brief description of the dominant schools of thought ===
By the 1920s, the marketing discipline was organised into three schools of thought: the commodity school, the institutional school and the functional school. The following sections briefly outlines the schools of thought as conceptualised by key thinkers in the discipline. Although these can be treated as separate schools of thought, considerable overlap between them is evident. The three schools that preceded marketing management exhibited a highly descriptive approach and collectively these are often called the classical schools. These schools borrowed heavily from economics and were largely concerned with aggregate demand and lacked a focus on the individual firm. By the 1960s, all previous schools of thought had been eclipsed by the managerial school because it offered a problem-solving approach and presented marketers with potential solutions to marketing problems that were frequently encountered.

==== The commodity school ====
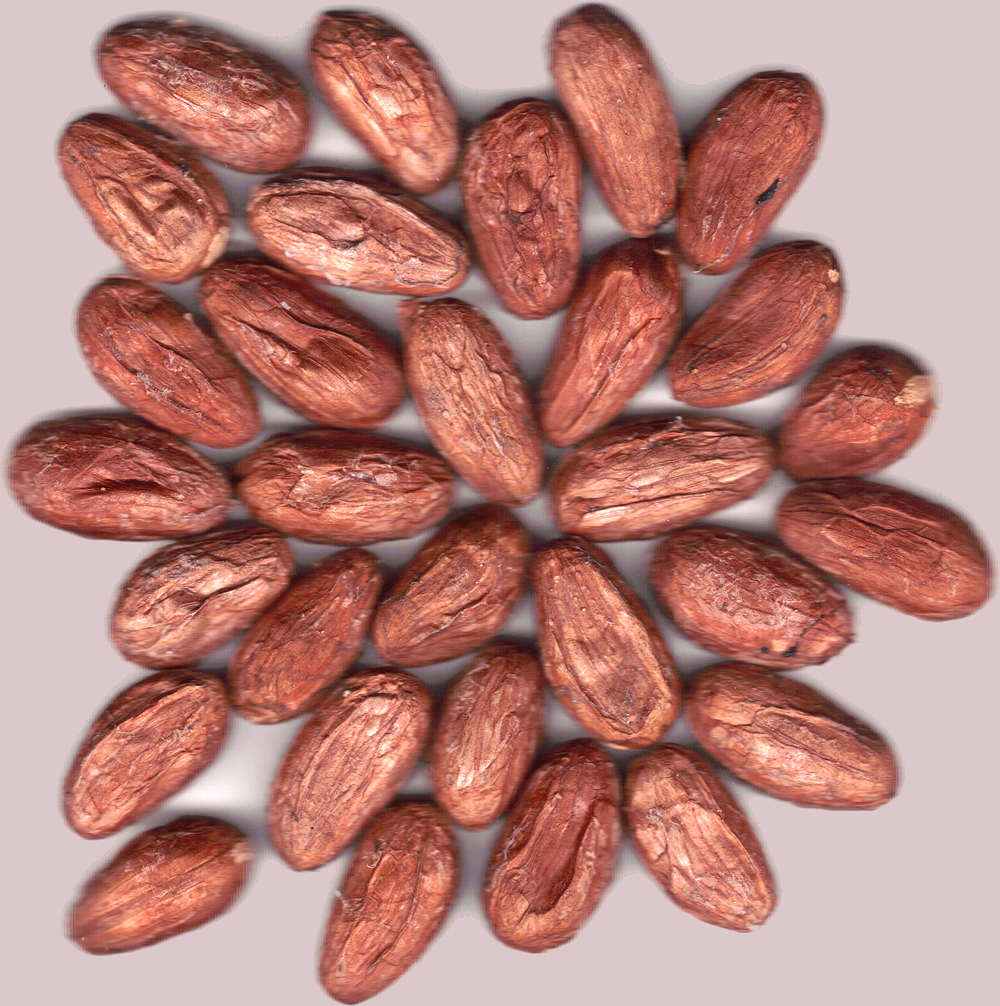
The commodity school focused on the objects of exchange. Pictured: Cacao beans

The commodity school is thought to have originated with an article by C.C. Parlin (1916) with a focus on the objects of exchange and was primarily concerned with classifying commodities. A different article published by Copeland, and published in the Harvard Business Review (1923) proposed the convenience-shopping-specialty goods classification which is still in use today. Other theorists developed a plethora of methods for classifying goods.

==== The institutional school ====
The institutional school focused its attention on the agents of market transactions, specifically those organisations active in the intermediary channel system, such as wholesalers and retailers. It was primarily concerned with documenting the channels of distribution, the functions performed by channel members and the value-adding services they provided. In short, the institutional school was fundamentally concerned with the activities required to achieve efficiency within distribution systems. The institutional school was heavily influenced by economics, but in the 1970s, began to take on ideas from behavioural science. A key work in the institutional school tradition is Weld's The Marketing of Farm Products, (1916) while other important contributors included: Butler's Marketing and Merchandising, (1923); Breyer's Commodity and Marketing (1931); Converse's Marketing: Methods and Policies (1921) and Duddy & Revzan's Marketing: An Institutional Approach (1947).

==== The functional school ====
The functional school was thought to have originated with the publication of Shaw's article, Some Problems in Market Distribution, (1912) The functional school was primarily concerned with documenting the functions of marketing. In other words, it attempted to address the question, What work does marketing do? Different theorists within the functional school produced long lists of marketing's functions. Although there was little agreement about what should be included in the list, much of it revolved around the value added by marketing intermediaries. In those early years, advertising and promotion was rarely seen as a marketing function. In addition to Shaw, key thinkers in the functional school included Weld, Vanderblue and Ryan.

==== Marketing management ====
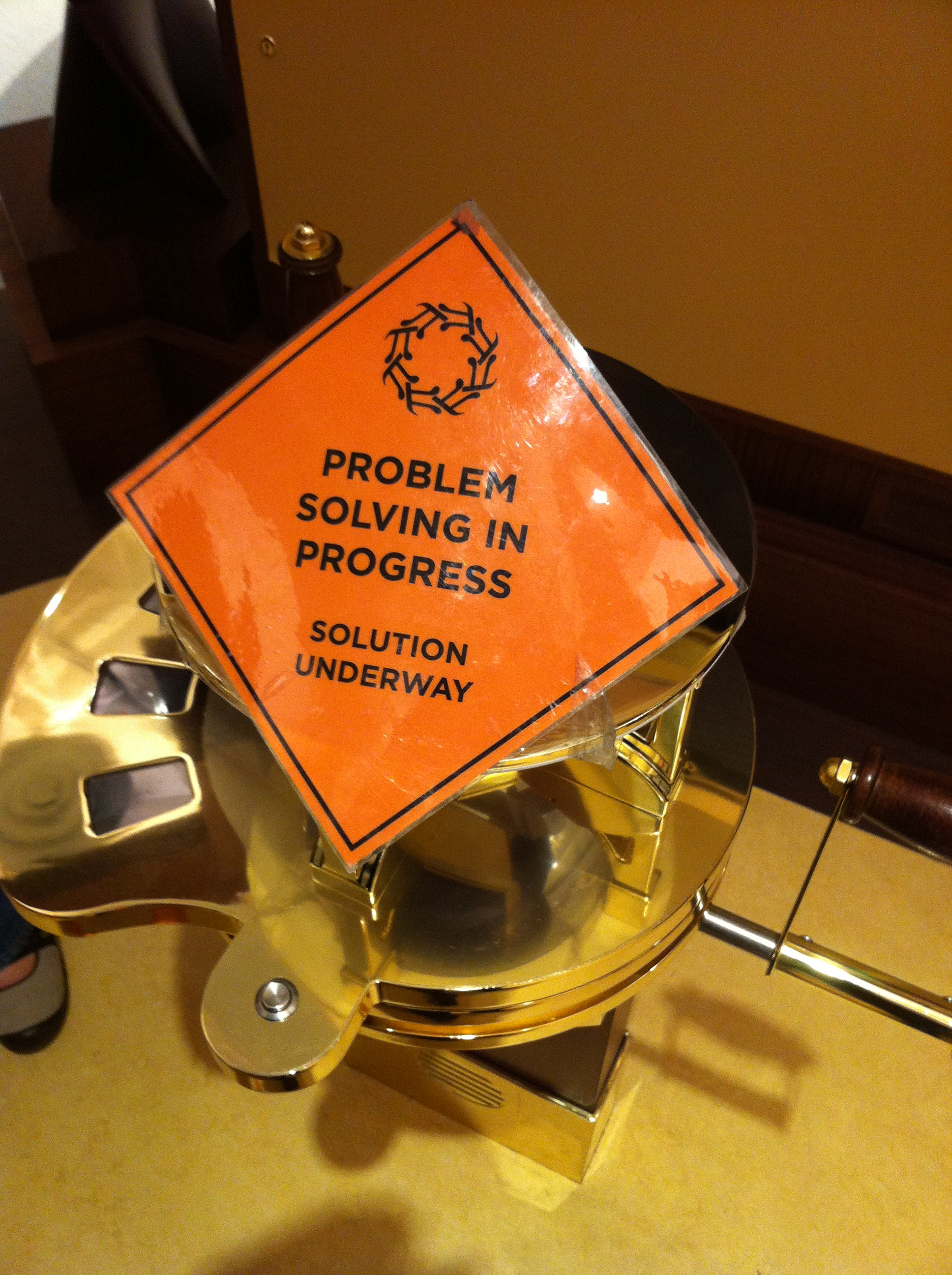
The marketing management school focuses on typical problems encountered by marketers

Wroe Alderson changed marketing thought with the publication of his work, Marketing Behaviour and Executive Action (1957) in which he was primarily concerned with the problems and challenges faced by marketers and the types of solutions that had been found to be successful. This shifted the emphasis away from the functions of marketing and towards a more problem-solving approach, thereby paving the way for a more managerial approach within the discipline. Some historians have claimed that Alderson's article signalled a paradigm shift in thinking, towards a new macromarketing approach.

The marketing management school emerged as the dominant school in the 1960s following the publication of Basic Marketing: A Managerial Approach, written by E. Jerome McCarthy and replaced the so-called functional school which had been the dominant school for the first part of the twentieth century. In the words of Hunt and Goolsby, the publication of McCarthy's text, sounded the "beginning of the end for the functional school." However, Hunt and Goolsby note that the 1960s was a transitional period in which both the functional school and the managerial school co-existed. Shaw and Jones have described the emergence of the managerial school in the mid-twentieth century as a "paradigm shift."

While the management school continued to borrow from economics, it also introduced ideas from the new and emerging fields of sociology and psychology, which offered useful insights for explaining aspects of consumer behaviour such as the influence of culture and social class. Key works in the marketing management tradition include Wroe Alderson's Marketing Behavior and Executive Action, (1957), Howard's Marketing Management (1957), Lazer's Managerial Marketing: Perspectives and Viewpoints, (1957) and McCarthy's Basic Marketing: A Managerial Approach (1960).

The salient features of the managerial approach to marketing are:

- "an overt marketing-as-management orientation, and
- an overt reliance on the behavioral and quantitative sciences as means of knowing."

== Key innovations that influenced marketing practice ==
- 1836: Paid advertising in a newspaper (in France)
- 1839: Posters on private property banned in England

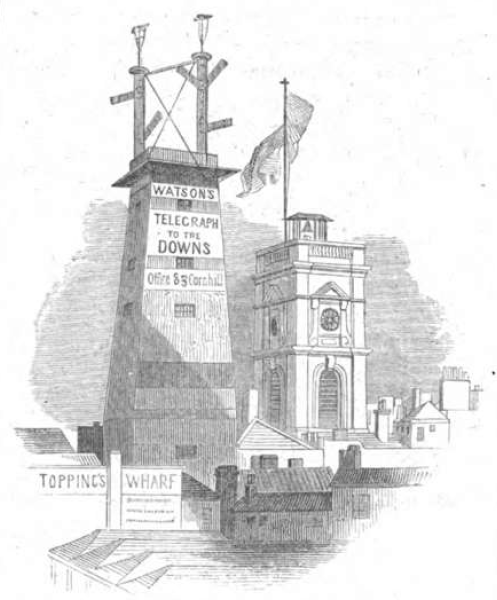
The telegraph was an early form of mass communication

- 1864: Earliest recorded use of the telegraph for mass unsolicited spam
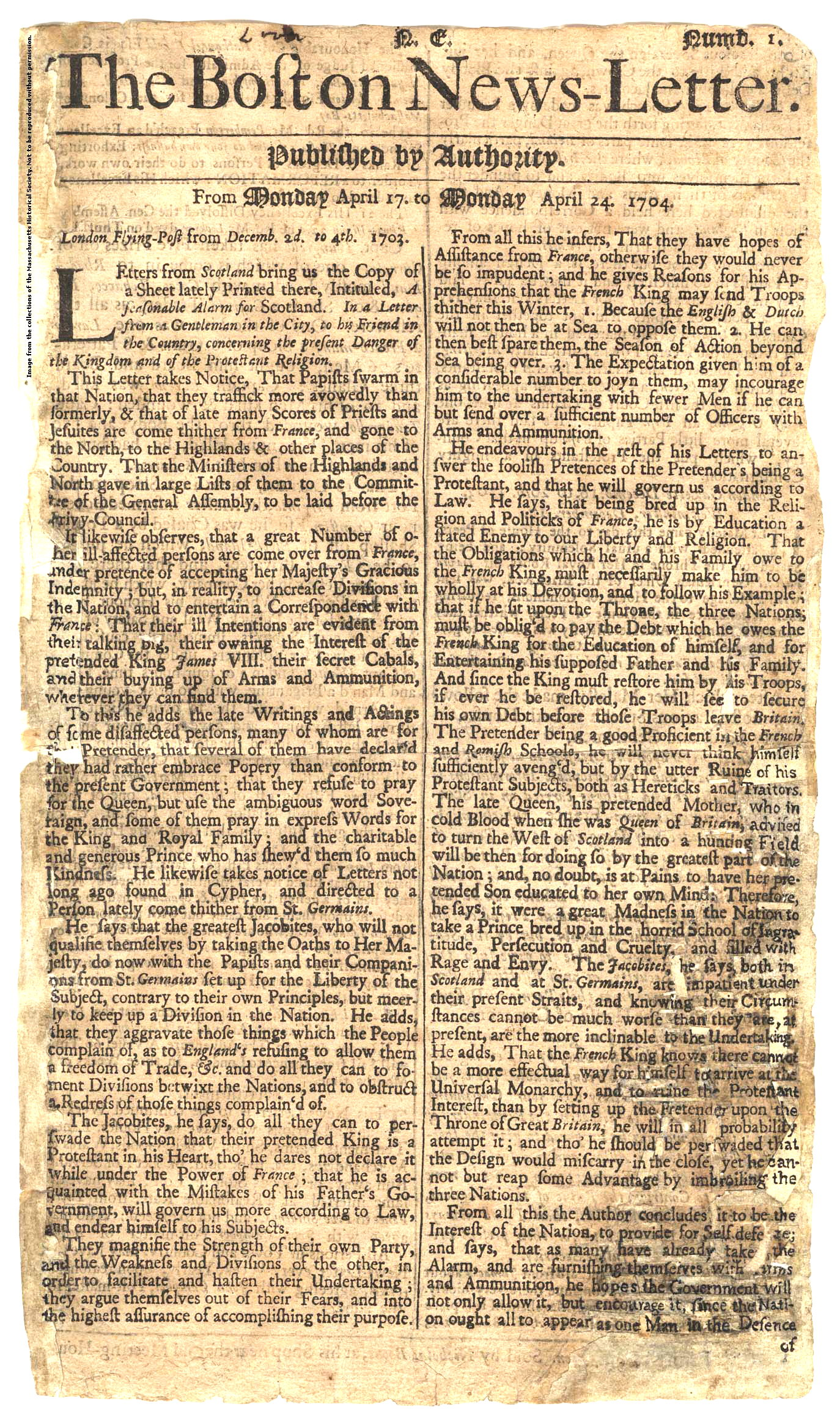
- Newspapers were an early form of mass communication. Pictured: The Boston News-Letter, 1704
  1867: Earliest recorded billboard rentals
- 1876: Films produced by French film-makers, Auguste and Louis Lumiere, made at the request of a representative of Lever Brothers in France and feature Sunlight soap, are thought to be the first recorded instance of paid product placement.

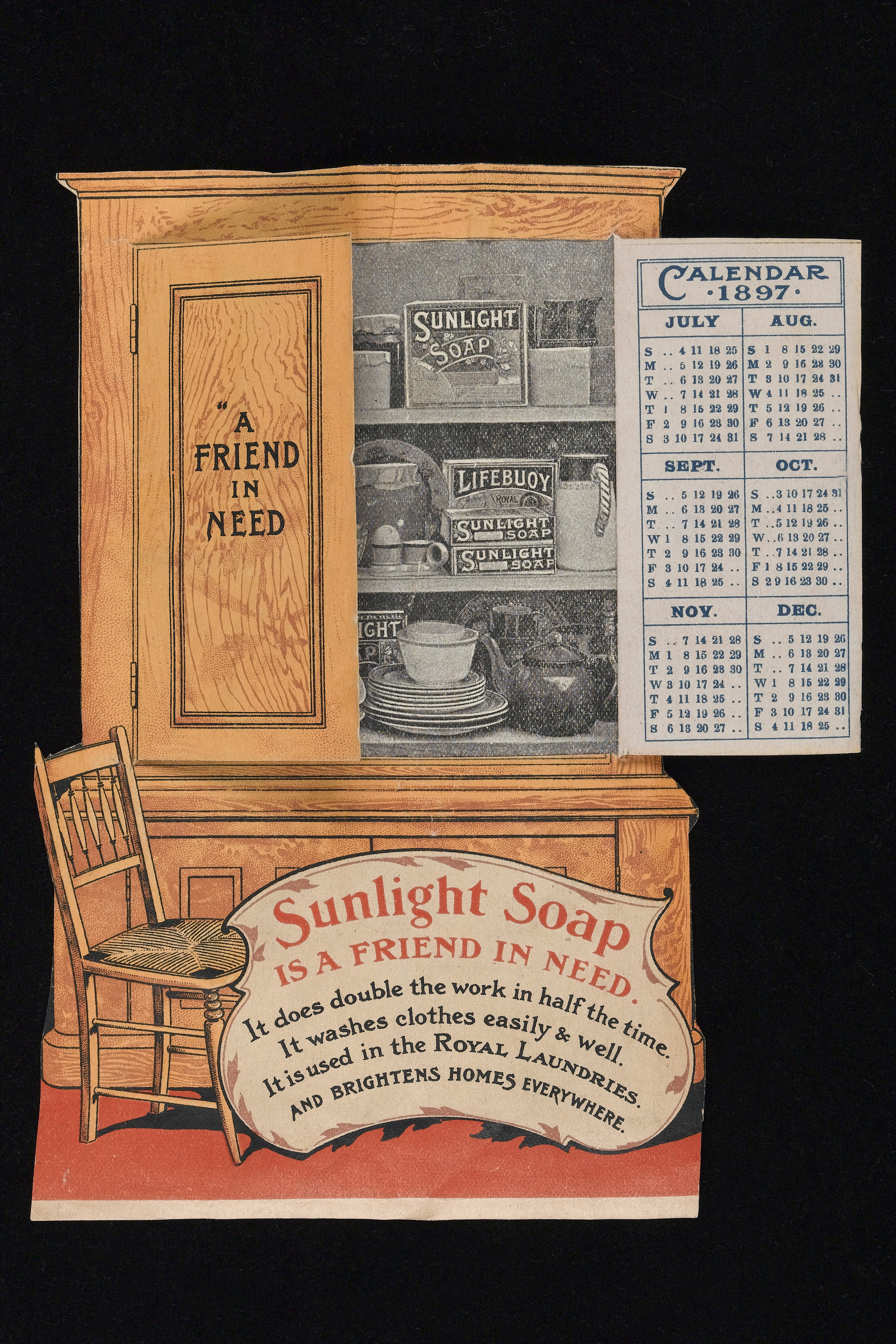
Sunlight was an early advertiser in cinema, radio and TV. Pictured: Advertisement for Sunlight Soap washing powder, 1897

- 1880s: Early examples of trademarks as branding
- 1902: The first marketing course, taught by Edward David Jones, was offered at the University of Michigan
- 1905: The University of Pennsylvania offered a course in "The Marketing of Products"
- 1908: Harvard Business School opens – Harvard was an early influence on marketing thought
- 1920: The magazine, Variety, reports that 50% of cinemas show advertising programmes
- 1920s: Radio advertising commences
- 1941: First recorded use of television advertising
- 1955: Television viewing exceeded radio listening for the first time in Britain
- 1950s: Systematization of telemarketing
- 1957: Three key scholarly texts published Wroe Alderson's Marketing Behavior and Executive Action; Howard's Marketing Management and Lazer's Managerial Marketing: Perspectives and Viewpoints
- 1960 E. Jerome McCarthy published his now classic, Basic Marketing: A Managerial Approach (1960).
- 1970s: E-commerce developed
- 1980s: Development of database marketing as precursor to CRM
- 1980s: Emergence of relationship marketing
- 1980s: Emergence of computer-oriented spam
- 1984: Introduction of guerrilla tactics
- 1985: Desktop publishing democratises the production of print-advertising (precursor to consumer-generated media and content)
- 1991: IMC gains academic status
- Mid 1990s: Modern search engines started appearing in the mid-1990s, with Google making its debut in 1998
- 1990s CRM and IMC (in various guises and names) gain dominance in promotions and marketing planning,
- 1996: Identification of viral marketing
- 2000s: Integrated marketing gains widespread acceptance with its first dedicated academic research centre opened in 2002
- 2003–2006: Emergence of social media. MySpace and LinkedIn emerged in 2003, Facebook in 2004 and Twitter in 2006.

== See also ==
- Advertising
- Advertising management – concerned with the theories and tactics that inform the practice of advertising
- Branding
- List of the oldest newspapers
- Market economy
- Marketing
- Marketing research
- Market segmentation
- Market (place)
- Psychological pricing
- Retail

=== General histories ===
- History of advertising (article)
- History of advertising (section)
- History of branding
- History of brand management
- History of market segmentation
- History of marketing research
- History of merchants and trading
- History of retailing
- History of shopping
- History of strategic marketing
- Origins of consumer behaviour
- Origins of the 'positioning' concept

=== Early marketing theorists ===
- Wroe Alderson (1898–1965) – proponent of marketing science and instrumental in developing the managerial school of marketing
- Igor Ansoff (1918–2002) – marketing/ management strategist; noted for the product/market growth matrix
- David Aaker – highly awarded educator and author in the area of marketing and organisational theory
- N. W. Ayer & Son – probably the first advertising agency to use mass media (i.e. telegraph) in a promotional campaign
- Leonard Berry (professor) – author and educator with strong interest in health marketing and relationship marketing
- Neil H. Borden (1922–1962) – coined the term, 'marketing mix'
- Clayton Christensen – educator, author and consultant, published in the areas of innovation and entrepreneurship
- George S. Day – author and educator; has published in the area of strategic marketing
- Ernest Dichter (1907–1991) – pioneer of motivational research
- Andrew S. C. Ehrenberg (1926–2010) – made contributions to the methodology of data collection, analysis and presentation, and to understanding buyer behaviour and how advertising works
- Edward Filene (1860–1937) – early pioneer of modern retailing methods
- Seth Godin – Popular author, entrepreneur, public speaker and marketer
- Paul E. Green -academic and author; the founder of conjoint analysis and popularised the use of multidimensional scaling, clustering, and analysis of qualitative data in marketing.
- Shelby D. Hunt -former editor of the Journal of Marketing and organisational theorist
- John E. Jeuck (1916–2009) – early marketing educator
- Philip Kotler (1931–) – popularised the managerial approach to marketing; prolific author
- E. St. Elmo Lewis – developed the AIDA model used in sales and advertising
- Christopher Lovelock (1940–2008) – author of many books and articles on services marketing
- Theodore Levitt (1925–2006) – former editor of Harvard Business Review, prolific author of marketing articles and famed for his article, "Marketing Myopia"
- E. Jerome McCarthy – popularised the managerial approach and developed the concept of the 4Ps
- Arthur Nielsen – early market researcher; pioneered methods for radio and TV ratings
- David Ogilvy (businessman) – advertising guru, early pioneer of product positioning
- Vance Packard – journalist and author, wrote The Hidden Persuaders (1957) which explored the use of motivational research in marketing practice
- Charles Coolidge Parlin(1872–1942) – pioneer of market and advertising research methods
- Rosser Reeves – advertising guru; advocate of frequency; pioneered the concept of the unique selling proposition (USP) – now largely replaced by the positioning concept
- Al Ries – advertising executive, author and credited with coining the term, 'positioning' in the late 1960s
- Don E. Schultz – father of 'integrated marketing communications'
- Arch Wilkinson Shaw (1876–1962) – early management theorist, proponent of the scientific approach to marketing
- Byron Sharp – N.Z. academic; one of the first to document buyer loyalty in empirical work
- Daniel Starch – developed the so-called Starch scores to measure impact of magazine advertising; Starch scores are still in use
- Henry Charles Taylor (1873–1969) – the agricultural marketer
- Richard S. Tedlow – author and educator; published in the area of marketing history
- J Walter Thompson – founded one of the earliest modern advertising agencies
- Jack Trout – advertising executive, author and partnered with Al Ries in popularising the positioning concept
- Stephen Vargo- together with R.F. Lusch developed the service-dominant approach to marketing
- Henry Grady Weaver (1889–1949) – developed the survey questionnaire for use in market research
- Jerry (Yoram) Wind – former editor of the Journal of Marketing, educator and marketer
- Gerald Zaltman – developed the Metaphor Elicitation Technique (ZMET)
- Valarie Zeithaml – together with A. Parasurman and L.L. Berry, developed the model of service quality and the SERVQUAL instrument
