= Louis Gray =

Louis or Lewis Gray may refer to:

- Louis Gray (footballer), Welsh footballer
- Louis Gray (producer), American film producer, of The Adventures of Champion
- Louis Herbert Gray (1875–1955), American orientalist
- Louis Harold Gray (1905–1965), British radiation physicist after whom the SI unit, the Gray, was named
- Lewis Cecil Gray (1881–1952), American agricultural economist
- Lou Gray, character in Along the Great Divide
