= Neil H. Borden =

American academic (1895–1980)

- Pete Borden
- Born: December 7, 1895; Boulder, Colorado
- Died: October 1, 1980 (aged 84); Topsfield, Massachusetts
- Occupation: Professor
- Years active: 1922–1962
- Board member of: Harvard Business Review
- Spouse: Esther Page

Academic background
- Education: MBA (Harvard, 1922)
- Alma mater: University of Colorado Boulder, Harvard Business School

Academic work
- Discipline: Marketing
- Sub-discipline: Advertising
- Institutions: Harvard Business School
- Notable works: The Economic Effects of Advertising (1942)
- Notable ideas: Marketing mix

Neil Hopper Borden (1895–1980) was an American academic, who served as a professor of advertising at the Harvard Graduate School of Business Administration. He coined the term "marketing mix".

== Early life ==
Neil H. Borden, nicknamed Pete, was born in Boulder, Colorado, in 1895. He was one of the seven children of Edmund and Irene Borden. He graduated from the University of Colorado in 1919, with a Bachelor of Arts (Economics) degree. On advice of his economics professor, he decided to focus on a teaching career in the emerging field of business administration. In order to finance his higher studies, he worked as a principal at the Lafayette High School during 1919–1920. His economics professor helped him get a scholarship at Columbia University. His friend Wilford White suggested he go to Harvard instead, an idea supported by the University's dean.

== At Harvard ==
Borden studied business administration at Harvard during 1920–1922. During this time, he earned money through an assistantship and as the bookkeeper of The Harvard Crimson. An exceptional student, he was made an assistant dean when he obtained his MBA degree in 1922. He did not hold a doctorate. He started teaching marketing under Melvin T. Copeland, and succeeded Daniel Starch as the teacher of advertising in 1925. He served as an assistant professor during 1925–1928. During this period, Arch Wilkinson Shaw helped him raise $60,000 for research. The research was published in form of Problems in Advertising, a book of advertising case studies, in 1927. The case study method was the basis of Borden's teaching style.

Borden next served as an associate professor during 1928–1938, before becoming a professor in 1938. During the Great Depression of 1929, the advertisers, such as Louis H. Weld of McCann Erickson, requested Harvard academics for an objective analysis of advertising's economic impact. Borden was selected to write a book on the topic, supported by a grant of $30,000 from the wife of Alfred W. Erickson. To accomplish this objective, Borden worked with an advisory committee of academic fellows and the Advertising Research Foundation. Several businesses and advertising agencies contributed material to his research. He took a leave of six months to focus on the book, when his teaching began to suffer. The 970-page book, The Economic Effects of Advertising, was published in January 1942.

Borden served as the President of the National Association of Marketing Teachers, and also as the national President (1953–1954) of its successor organization, the American Marketing Association. During 1956–1962, he was the chairman of the Harvard Business Review board. He retired from teaching in 1962, and focused on writing.

== The marketing mix ==
During the 1940s, the discipline of marketing was in transition. Interest in the functional school of thought, which was primarily concerned with the functions of marketing was waning while the managerial school of thought, which focussed on the problems and challenges confronting marketers was gaining ground. The concept of marketers as "mixers of ingredients," first introduced by James Culliton, one of Borden's colleagues at Harvard, had gained some currency amongst scholars who debated, what elements should be considered as part of the set of ingredients. Many scholars and practitioners relied on checklists or lengthy classifications of factors that needed to be considered to understand consumer responses. Borden himself developed a complicated model in the late 1940s, based upon at least twelve different factors.

In the mid-1960s, Borden published a retrospective article detailing the early history of the marketing mix in which he claims that he was inspired by Culliton's idea of 'mixers', and credits himself with coining the term 'marketing mix'. According to Borden's account, he used the term, 'marketing mix' consistently from the late 1940s. For instance, he is on record as having used the term in his presidential address given to the American Marketing Association in 1953. Borden's continued and consistent use of the phrase "marketing mix" contributed to the process of popularising the concept. The "marketing mix" concept gained widespread acceptance with the publication, in 1960, of E. Jerome McCarthy's text, Basic Marketing: A Managerial Approach which outlined the ingredients in the mix as the memorable 4 Ps, namely product, price, place and promotion.

Borden did not define the mix, but his outline of the concept included 12 aspects: product planning, pricing, branding, distribution channels, personal selling, advertising, promotions, packaging, display, servicing, physical handling and fact finding/analysis. He recognised that other students of marketing might collate a different set of elements.

== Personal life ==
Neil H. Borden married Esther Page in 1922. The couple had two sons and two daughters.

== Awards and honors ==
- Kappa Tau Alpha Research Award (1945)
- American Marketing Association Research Award (1945–46)
- Charles Coolidge Parlin Memorial Award (1949) by American Marketing Association
- Distinguished Service Medal In Advertising by Syracuse University (1949)
- Paul D. Converse Award (1951) by American Marketing Association, for advancing the science of marketing
- Elected to Hall of Fame in Distribution (1953)
- American Advertising Federation Hall of Fame (1991)

== Books authored ==
- Neil H. Borden (1927). Problems in Advertising. A. W. Shaw & Co.
- Neil H. Borden (1942). The Economic Effects of Advertising. Chicago: Richard D. Irwin.
- Neil H. Borden (1945). Advertising in Our Economy: A Condensed Version of the Economic Effects of Advertising. Chicago: Richard D. Irwin.
- Neil H. Borden; Malcolm D. Taylor; Howard T. Hovde (1946). National Advertising in Newspapers. Harvard University Press.
- Neil H. Borden (1950). Advertising: Text and Cases. Richard D. Irwin.
- Neil H. Borden; Martin V. Marshall (1959). Advertising Management: Text and Cases. Richard D. Irwin.

== See also ==
- History of marketing
- Marketing
- Marketing mix
