= Oliver Edwin Baker =

American economic geographer (1883–1949)

Oliver Edwin Baker (September 10, 1883 – December 2, 1949) was an American economic geographer.

== Education and early career ==
Baker was born on September 10, 1883, in Tiffin, Ohio. His father, Edwin Baker, was a merchant, and his mother, Martha Ranney Thomas, had been a schoolteacher. His health in his early life was so poor that he did not begin school until the age of 12, before which time he was taught by his mother. After graduating public school he went on to Heidelberg College. He graduated with a B.S. degree in history and mathematics at the age of 19 in 1903, and took an M.S. degree in philosophy and sociology a year later. The next year he went on to Columbia University, receiving an M.A. in political science in 1905. He studied forestry at Yale University School of Forestry from 1907 to 1908, and later did graduate work at the University of Wisconsin–Madison in agriculture. From 1908 to 1912 he worked with the University of Wisconsin–Madison's Agricultural Experiment Station. Baker co-authored a bulletin for the Experiment Station, which studied the climate of Wisconsin and its effects on agriculture, published in 1912. From 1910 to 1912, he also worked with the Wisconsin Soil Survey during the summers.

By 1912, he took a job with the United States Department of Agriculture, where he would stay for the next thirty years. Baker's work was noticed rather quickly, in part because of his contributions to the Yearbooks from 1915 to 1938, several of which he edited. For the first eighteen years at the USDA he was devoted to studying the geographical aspects of land use. One of his first works, co-authoring Geography of the World's Agriculture (1917) with Vernor Clifford Finch, led him to even wider recognition. Shortly after its publication, Baker returned to the University of Wisconsin–Madison for further graduate study, in economics, and earned his Ph.D. in 1921 with a dissertation on land utilization. While there, Baker had been influenced by Henry Charles Taylor and Richard T. Ely, two notable economists, to shift his work more toward the economic aspect of geography and agriculture. In 1922, he joined the USDA's new Bureau of Agricultural Economics, headed by Henry C. Taylor. With the success of the Geography of the World's Agriculture, he instigated work on the Atlas of American Agriculture, on which he himself was planner and editor. The massive work was released in six parts between 1918 and 1936.

Baker acted as a part-time professor at Clark University from 1923 to 1927, and later gave several series of lectures at other universities. With the appearance of the journal Economic Geography, Baker became associate editor, and later a contributor of a notable series of articles on regional agricultural geography of North America. His interest in farm populations started around 1920, however it was during the 1930s that this field became a major focus of the USDA. Baker was particularly interested in the migration of rural youths into urban areas. Even into his later years, populations problems occupied much of his research and energies. Baker recognized that only a minority of the world's population lived under decent living conditions. He turned his attention to improving standards for American farmers. He hoped to achieve this by raising the level of appreciation for farmers and their contributions within the United States, and studying recent trends to aid in planning and forecasting potential problems. He also tried to encourage Americans to have larger families in order to ensure successful future generations in the country.

Baker had been critical of many aspects of urban life, and collaborated with Ralph Borsodi on Agriculture in Modern Life (1939), advocating a return to rural living. He himself however suggested more of a "rurban" lifestyle, which combined aspects of both urban and rural life. He married in 1925 to Alice Hargrave Crew. They had four children together- Helen, Sabra, Edwin, and Mildred- and raised them in then-suburban College Park, Maryland with five acres where they were able to raise chicken and cows and have a garden. He later bought a large farm near New Market, Virginia where he could take up his interest in soil conservation.

In 1931, he was elected president of the Association of American Geographers, and received honorary doctorates from Heidelberg College in Ohio and the University of Göttingen in Germany.

== Career at College Park, Maryland ==
Baker left Washington D.C. for the University of Maryland, College Park in 1942, accepting an invitation to establish a Department of Geography there. Baker assembled the Department's faculty himself and attracted many students, as well as promoted many research projects. He retired from his position in July 1949 in order to devote himself to completing his various research projects. His main work at the time was the Atlas of World Resources, which was being created by the USDA and the Bureau of Mines, but also initiated the China Atlas, continuing a long interest of his in China. However, neither of these works were completed by the time of his death. Baker had always been highly dedicated to teaching and gave his time generously to students and visitors.

Having suffered from health problems his entire life, he died on December 2, 1949, in College Park, Maryland.
