= Henry Charles Taylor =

American agriculturalist

- Born: April 16, 1873 near Stockport, Iowa, U.S.
- Died: April 28, 1969 (aged 96); Washington, D.C., U.S.
- Education: Iowa State College (BS, MS); University of Wisconsin–Madison (PhD)
- Occupation: Agricultural economist
- Spouse: Anne Dewees Taylor
- Children: 1

Henry Charles Taylor (April 16, 1873 – April 28, 1969) was an American agricultural economist. As an early pioneer in the field, he has been called the "father of agricultural economics" in the United States. Taylor established the first university department dedicated to agricultural economics in the United States in 1909 during his time at the University of Wisconsin–Madison. He also had a brief but very influential career in the United States Department of Agriculture from 1919 to 1925, where he helped reorganize its offices and became head of the new Bureau of Agricultural Economics. Coming from a rural farm community himself, Taylor's foremost goal was always to try to improve the living conditions of farmers.

== Early life ==
Taylor was born in Iowa on a farm near Stockport. Growing up, he witnessed his father, Tarpley Taylor, expand his farm from about 60 acres (240,000 m^{2}) to 600 acres (2.4 km^{2}) by buying small farms from early settlers. From an early age he was able to see how proper land and economic management reinforced each other. Additionally, Taylor had been impacted by the depressions of the late 19th century, especially that of the 1890s, and what devastating effects they had on farmers. He entered Drake University to do two years of preparatory work, then went on to Iowa State College, where he received his B.S. in agriculture in 1896, then his M.S. in agriculture in 1898. He then joined the University of Wisconsin–Madison to earn his Ph.D. Taylor's original intention upon going to Wisconsin was to take up a career as a statesman in order to represent farmers. However he soon realized that his economics study offered more than he was expecting. Later in his career, he stated that "90 per cent of what could be done for the farmers was what they could do for themselves by adjusting production." Inspired by economics professor Richard T. Ely, he left in 1899 to travel through Europe, briefly studying economics at the London School of Economics in Britain and at the University of Halle-Wittenberg and the University of Berlin in Germany. His doctoral dissertation was on "The Decline of Land Owners Farmers in England," which had him traveling by bicycle to visit more than a hundred farms. Taylor returned to Wisconsin in 1901 to complete his degree in economics in 1902.

=== Career at the University of Wisconsin–Madison ===
He stayed on at the faculty of the University of Wisconsin until 1919. Room was made for him in the Department of General Economics and the School of Commerce to teach economic geography and economic history. However, as he later noted there was nothing in the budget to provide for his area of interest, agricultural economics. Ely suggested that he simply teach the given courses and slowly develop work on agricultural economics. Upon approaching the dean with the idea, he was told there would be no place for such courses for the next ten years. Nevertheless, by the winter of 1902–03, Ely had arranged for fourteen lectures to be given to agricultural students on the economics of farm management. The dean was impressed by the prepared syllabus and eventually Taylor set up an agricultural economics course for four-year students. He devoted himself by 1903 to founding a Department of Agricultural Economics at the university for both research and teaching. Taylor wrote the first agricultural economics textbook in the United States in 1905. He also adapted a dot map system with William J. Spillman to show historical shifts in agricultural production.

By 1909 he was successful in creating the new department, the first devoted to agricultural economics in the United States. By this time he had also broadened the scope of the field to include rural sociology. In 1910 he authored the first Wisconsin Experiment Station bulletin on agricultural economics, on the Methods of Renting Farm Lands in Wisconsin. Taylor also worked with the Wisconsin state government after being spurred on by Charles McCarthy, an advocate of cooperation between the government, farmers, and universities. Wisconsin's new Department of Agriculture was asked to provide leadership in improving the marketing of dairy as the state was seeing a recent shift toward greater milk production. Taylor used this as an opportunity to secure funding from the government to create a new faculty position for marketing. For this, he invited his long-time friend and head of the Department of Economics at Iowa State College Benjamin Horace Hibbard. He joined the department in 1913 to become its second faculty member.

Taylor was also a founding member of the Farm Management Association, which later became the American Farm Economic Association. He served as its president in 1920.

== Government career ==
From 1909 to 1910 he assisted the Bureau of the Census to plan its schedule for the agricultural census, as well as for a special census of plantations. Taylor chose to join the United States Department of Agriculture for the chance at giving a national role to agricultural economics, even though the new position meant a large reduction in salary. He moved to Washington D.C. in 1919 to take charge of the USDA's Office of Farm Management and Farm Economics. Not long after his arrival in Washington, the wartime prices of farm products collapsed, which proved disastrous for a great number of farmers. In 1920, President Harding appointed Henry C. Wallace, who knew Taylor and was himself a great supporter of farmers, as the new Secretary of Agriculture. Taylor soon became Chief of the Bureau of Markets and Crop Estimates, while also being part of a commission to reorganize the offices of the USDA. For him this was a chance to consolidate the economics work of the department which had been scattered through many offices. In 1922, Wallace appointed him chief of the new Bureau of Agricultural Economics, which subsumed the former Office of Farm Management and Bureau of Markets and Crop Estimates (today the Agricultural Research Service and Agricultural Marketing Service). Among Taylor's tasks in the USDA were the expansion of agricultural information services, creating foreign outposts for the USDA to better collect information on world production and consumption, standardizing the grading of exported American crops, especially cotton, and inaugurating the Agricultural Outlook Service. He also brought many talented new people into the USDA. Among them, two of his Ph.D. students he had already sent to work with Spillman, Oscar C. Stine and Oliver Edwin Baker, and Lewis Cecil Gray, whom he persuaded to go with him to Washington.

One of the major issues at the time was the controversy surrounding the first McNary–Haugen Farm Relief Bill in 1924 and other farmer subsidies proposals, however Taylor later stated his own involvement was only indirect. The bill was not supported by the White House but had support from much of the Department of Agriculture. Wallace died unexpectedly in late 1924, and Taylor had lost one of his greatest supporters. President Coolidge appointed William Marion Jardine as the new Secretary of Agriculture in 1925. Although he knew Taylor and they possibly were friends, Coolidge appointed Jardine on the condition that he get rid of Taylor. Jardine asked him to step down and he would try to find him a government position of equivalent rank. Taylor ignored the request and carried on his work, stating that he himself never actively supported the McNary-Haugen Bill or any other such program. Taylor was dismissed from his post officially on August 15, 1925. Despite his short government career, he was still able to make major contributions to the Department of Agriculture, which had become one of the first great economic research organizations in the United States. Disappointed by his termination, he went on to give speeches to farm groups, especially in Iowa, with the main message that Washington was more interested in providing cheap food to urban workers than the welfare of farmers. Taylor wrote of his experience in government in 1926 in a 317-page manuscript called "A Farm Economist in Washington, 1919-1925." Although intended to be released as a book to the public, it was never published.

== Later life ==
Taylor returned to his academic career, briefly rejoining Ely, then going to Northwestern University to work with the Institute for Research in Land Economics until 1928. He then went to New England for three years to serve as Director of the Survey of Rural Vermont. In 1931, Taylor served as director of the Vermont Commission on Country Life.

Taylor then left the United States and traveled through Japan, China, Korea, and India as a member of the Commission of Appraisal of the Layman's Foreign Missions Inquiry for one year, in which he reviewed the work done by missionaries on rural problems. He then went to Rome to serve as the United States member of the Permanent Committee of the International Institution of Agriculture between 1933 and 1935.

He returned to the United States in 1935 on request from Illinois Governor Frank Lowden to serve as managing director of the recently created Farm Foundation in Chicago until 1945, where he focused on the broad problems of rural communities and worked to establish a relationship between researchers in the USDA and state agricultural colleges. He also worked closely with Oscar C. Stine on studying the history and development of agricultural economics. In 1936 he also served as president of the Agricultural History Society, of which he was a life member. In 1945 he was transferred to Washington D.C. to serve as Agricultural Economist for the Farm Foundation. This allowed him to devote himself to writing his book, The Story of Agricultural Economics, with his wife Anne Dewees Taylor, and the foundation's sponsorship. With its completion in 1952, Taylor began a study of land scarcity in highly industrialized nations like England, Germany, and Japan, and how their economies were adapting with the loss of their colonies. He stayed active to the end of his life. Taylor regularly attended the meetings of the International Conference of Agricultural Economists until he was 90, and also worked to complete a 100-year history of the original Taylor farm, Tarplewick, started by his parents in Iowa in 1861.

Even before his death he had become known as the "father of agricultural economics" in the United States. However Taylor himself noted the pioneer work of five of his contemporaries in the field along with him: Andrew Boss, William J. Spillman, and George F. Warren, from a background in agronomy, and Benjamin H. Hibbard and Thomas Nixon Carver, who along with himself were students of Richard T. Ely in general economics. Taylor nonetheless embraced this role as a sort of elder statesman, and accepted many visitors to his home, including many young agricultural economists. He found teaching to be the most rewarding part of his career. Taylor was eventually hospitalized by bone cancer of the leg, a terminal illness, but even then continued to see visitors. He died in April 1969 at the Sibley Memorial Hospital in Washington. He was survived by his daughter, Esther E. Taylor.

== Bibliography ==
- Taylor, Henry C. (1903). "Conditions Affecting Sugar Beet Culture in the United States". The Annals of the American Academy of Political and Social Science. 22: 179–87. doi:10.1177/000271620302200114. JSTOR 1010072. S2CID 144300501.
- Henry Charles Taylor (1919). Agricultural Economics. Macmillan.
- John Donald Black; Henry Charles Taylor; Benjamin Horace Hibbard (1920). Land tenure in Wisconsin with special reference to the land tenure stages. University of Wisconsin--Madison.
- Henry Charles Taylor; University of Wisconsin--Madison. Dept. of Agricultural Economics (1992). A farm economist in Washington, 1919-1925. Dept. of Agricultural Economics, University of Wisconsin-Madison.
- "Henry C. Taylor". JSTOR.
