= E. Jerome McCarthy =

American marketing professor and author

Edmund Jerome McCarthy
- Born: February 20, 1928
- Died: December 3, 2015 (aged 87); Michigan
- Other names: E. Jerome McCarthy, Jerry McCarthy
- Occupations: Professor, author, consultant
- Spouse: Joanne McCarthy

Academic background
- Education: B. Sc, Northwestern University, 1950; MA, University of Minnesota, 1954; PhD, University of Minnesota, 1958
- Alma mater: Northwestern University, University of Minnesota
- Thesis: An Analysis of the Use of Marketing Research in Product Development, 1958

Academic work
- Discipline: Marketing
- Institutions: Harvard Business School, University of Notre Dame, Michigan State University, University of Oregon
- Notable works: Basic Marketing: A Managerial Approach (1960)
- Notable ideas: The 4 Ps

Edmund Jerome McCarthy (February 20, 1928 – December 3, 2015) was an American marketing professor and author. He proposed the concept of the 4 Ps marketing mix in his 1960 book Basic Marketing: A Managerial Approach, which has been one of the top textbooks in university marketing courses since its publication. According to the Oxford Dictionary of Marketing, McCarthy was a "pivotal figure in the development of marketing thinking". He was also a founder, advisory board member, and consultant for Planned Innovation Institute, which was established to bolster Michigan industry. In 1987, McCarthy received the American Marketing Association's Trailblazer Award, and was voted one of the "top five" leaders in marketing thought by the field's educators.

== Education ==
McCarthy received his Bachelor of Science degree in 1950 from Northwestern University. He received his Master of Arts in 1954 and his PhD in 1958 from the University of Minnesota. His doctoral dissertation was An Analysis of the Use of Marketing Research in Product Development.

== Career ==
=== Early career ===
He was a professor of the College of Commerce at the University of Notre Dame, beginning in 1956, where he taught courses about how statistics and mathematics applied to business problems.

In the spring of 1959, while a professor of the College of Commerce, he was informed that he received a one-year Ford Foundation Fellowship at Harvard Business School and Massachusetts Institute of Technology. Beginning in September, he focused on mathematical applications for business, as part of the Foundation's program to "strengthen business education and research", and specifically to work on mathematical models for marketing.

=== Development of the 4Ps ===
At the time when McCarthy began his teaching career, the so-called functional school of thought dominated the discipline. The functional school was primarily concerned with asking questions about what are the functions of marketing, what activities does marketing perform, what is the role of marketing within organizations? Much of the theorizing within the functional school focused on the value adding services performed by intermediaries. As the marketing discipline matured, scholars increasingly searched for a more managerial approach that focused on solving the problems and challenges faced by marketing managers. Throughout the 1950s, a number of different approaches to managerial marketing emerged. However, some theorists clung to the functional approach, to the extent that both the functional approach and the managerial approach co-existed for a decade or so.

The demise of the functional approach has largely been attributed to McCarthy's contribution. According to Hunt and Goolsby, "The publication of McCarthy's Basic Marketing (1960) is widely cited as the 'beginning of the end' for the functional approach." The 1960s represent a transitional period wherein books adopting the managerial approach existed side by side with those using the more traditional functional approach.

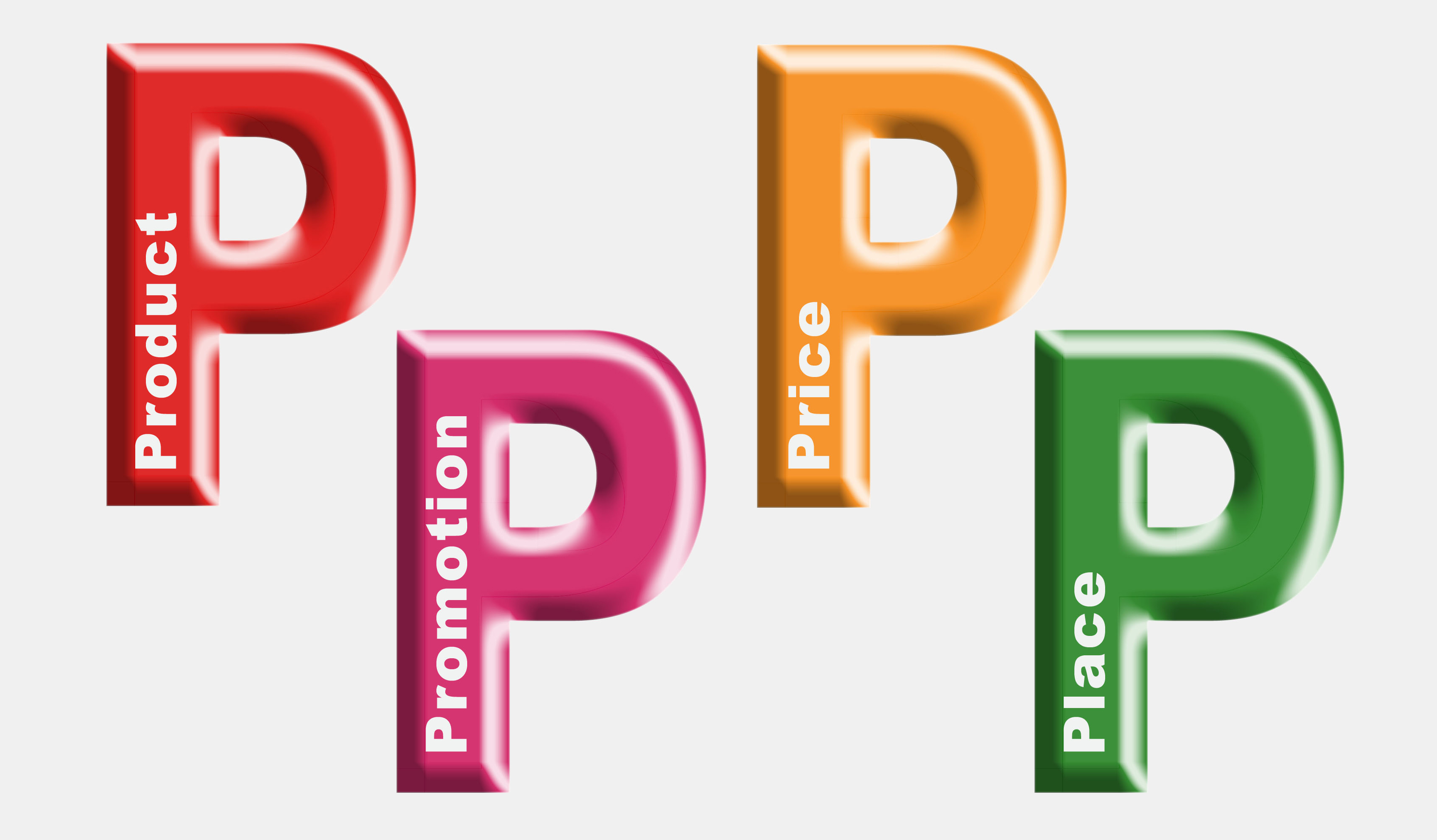
McCarthy defined the 4Ps conceptual framework for marketing decision-making, which used product, price, place (or distribution), and promotion in the marketing mix.

In 1960, McCarthy was the first to propose a marketing mix concept that resonated with both practitioners and academics. In his textbook Basic Marketing: A Managerial Approach (1960), McCarthy defined the 4Ps conceptual framework for marketing decision-making, which used product, price, place (or distribution), and promotion in the marketing mix. McCarthy organized his text along managerial lines using the four Ps framework. The book's emphasis was on the problems facing the marketing manager, rather than looking at the characteristics of marketing systems and their functions. In addition to chapters devoted to the 4 Ps, the book also included chapters on consumer behavior, marketing research and market segmentation to round out the tools available to marketers for use in problem-solving.

The managerial approach views marketing as a management science. It uses problem-solving to "develop an optimum offering of products, prices, promotion, and place (distribution)," according to the Handbook of Marketing. A key feature of the managerial approach is that it began to move away from its economics foundations and instead introduced ideas from the new and emerging fields of sociology and psychology, which offered useful insights for explaining aspects of consumer behaviour such as the influence of culture and social class. It also placed an overt reliance on the quantitative sciences as means of knowing."

Prior to the publication of McCarthy's text, the concept of a marketing mix was being debated, however, there was little consensus among marketers about what elements should comprise the marketing mix. They relied on checklists or lengthy classifications of factors that needed to be considered to understand consumer responses. Neil H. Borden of the Harvard Business School developed a complicated model in the late 1940s, based upon at least twelve different factors. In contrast, McCarthy's concept was a simplifed, memorable set of factors for managerial planning and decision-making.

McCarthy's marketing mix is based upon four controllable variables that a company manages in its effort to satisfy the corporation's objectives as well as the needs and wants of a target market. Once there is understanding of the target market's interests, marketers develop tactics, using the 4Ps, to encourage buyers to purchase product. The successful use of the model is predicated upon the degree to which the target market's needs and wants have been understood, and the extent to when the marketers developed the tactics accordingly.

McCarthy's 4Ps concept is particularly suited to most consumer products. The model needs modifications for high-end consumer products, in which case relationship management is a factor. Services have some unique marketing issues to be factored into decision-making. Tactics for marketing industrial products should consider elements of long-term contractual agreements. Regardless of the modifications needed in some cases, the 4Ps remain a generally accepted marketing practice to influence buyers and its concepts still are espoused in contemporary textbooks. Further, the 4Ps marketing mix that McCarthy popularized has become a foundational and widely adopted marketing framework into the 21st century. (Note: In 1972, Donald C. Marschner, then of the University of New Hampshire, wrote that McCarthy's book "still remains the standard against which all other introductory text-books should be judged." John A. Quelch and Katherine E. Jocz wrote in their "Milestones in Marketing" (2008) article, "Now, the marketing-mix concept is nearly always used in conjunction with the famous 'four Ps' categories... originated by E. Jerome McCarthy. They noted four years later that this book is one of the most widely adopted introductory texts in the history of marketing.) This is partly due to the simplicity of the model, which makes it adaptable for changes in the marketing area, such as internet commerce. Rather than creating a new model, G. Dominic expressed that McCarthy's 4 Ps could be used with some "extension and adjustment" to develop tactics for the current, ever-changing marketing arena like internet commerce.

Basic Marketing: A Managerial Approach is one of the world's most popular marketing textbooks. It has been updated by McCarthy and coauthor William D. Perreault more than a dozen times. The textbook's 19th edition was published in 2013.

=== Educator and author ===
McCarthy had the Ford Foundation Fellowship in 1963 and 1964, when he investigated the role of marketing in global economic development. After Notre Dame, McCarthy moved to Michigan. He was on the faculty in the Department of Marketing and Supply Chain Management at Michigan State University (MSU). In 2013, he was Professor Emeritus there. During his career, McCarthy also held a position at the University of Oregon.

As an educator, he interested students in marketing and effective marketing strategy planning. He also developed teaching materials for other marketing professors, including "developing and improving marketing texts to reflect the most current thinking in the field".

He has published books and articles in the areas of general marketing, social issues in marketing, and data processing.

=== Planned Innovation Institute ===
McCarthy played a pivotal role in the Planned Innovation Institute as founder, Advisory Board member, and consulting educator. Planned Innovation Institute was founded to identify causes and create solutions to address "major causes of new product failure in Michigan industry." It modeled its program's concepts after the University of Michigan Institute of Science and Technology research program.

McCarthy, with Frank R. Bacon, Jr., used the concepts from his Basic Marketing textbook to develop the institute's Product-Market Analysis component that first focused on new product innovation and then business retention strategies. He traveled to India, South Africa, Latin America, and within the United States for its market-oriented planning and management educational programs. His clients included Dow Chemical Company, Rockwell International, Steelcase, Bemis Manufacturing Company, Grupo Industrial Alfa, Coredemex, Lear Siegler, the Sarns division of 3M, and United Nations businessmen in Costa Rica.

=== Membership and awards ===
McCarthy was a member of the American Marketing Association and the Economics Society. In 1987, he received the American Marketing Association's Trailblazer Award. He was also named one of the "top five" leaders in marketing thought by marketing educators.

== Personal life ==
McCarthy and his wife, Joanne, had eight children. He died December 3, 2015.

The McCarthys established the Joanne N. and E. Jerome McCarthy Endowment for Arts Education, which has supported the Wharton Center for Performing Arts on the Michigan State University campus.

== See also ==
- History of marketing
- Marketing
