= Wroe Alderson =

American marketing theorist (1898–1965)

- Portrait of Wroe Alderson from Wharton Magazine
- Born: September 27, 1898; St. Louis, Missouri, U.S.
- Died: May 31, 1965 (aged 66); Royal Oak, Maryland
- Board member of: American Marketing Association, President; Marketing Theory Seminar, Founder; The Institute of Management Sciences
- Spouse: Elsie Wright Alderson
- Children: 2
- Awards: Pabst Award (1944); Hall of Fame in Distribution (1953); Charles Coolidge Parlin Award (1954); Paul D. Converse Award (1955)

Academic background
- Education: University of Pennsylvania

Academic work
- Discipline: Economics
- Sub-discipline: Marketing
- Institutions: Wharton School of Finance and Commerce

Wroe Alderson (September 27, 1898 – May 31, 1965) was an American marketing theorist who has been described as one of the most influential marketing scholars of the twentieth century and as the “father of modern marketing”. He was also an active member of the Religious Society of Friends, the Quakers.

== Background ==
Alderson studied at George Washington University, the Massachusetts Institute of Technology, and the University of Pennsylvania. He served as president of the American Marketing Association and was highly active in The Institute of Management Sciences. He began his business career at the U.S. Department of Commerce, founded the internationally prominent marketing consulting firm of Alderson Associates, and served as a professor at Wharton University of Pennsylvania after joining it in 1959. While always deeply involved in the advancement of marketing science he also believed that theory and practice go hand in hand. This also suited his scientific method. From a methodological perspective, he emphasized inductive theorizing from market place events, providing a balanced to the neo-classical theories of firm behaviour. He also had the ability to communicate in the language of many disciplines and to bridge the business and academic communities.

A significant element of his contribution to marketing thinking is his insistence upon an interdisciplinary approach, attracting the interest of scientists from other fields and borrowing from other disciplines such as psychology, philosophy and anthropology.

He argued that firms are ecological systems that grow and adapt to change; each seeks its own niche based on organised behaviour systems: "All marketing activity is an aspect of the interaction among organized behavior systems related to each other in what may be described as an ecological network. Operating systems are a subclass of behavior systems, distinguished by inputs and outputs and the structuring of processes to achieve efficiency."

"The functionalist approach is concerned with the functioning of systems, and the study of structure is essential to the analysis and interpretations of functions. Every phase of marketing can be understood as human behavior within the framework of some operating system. Survival and growth are implicit goals of every behavior system, including most particularly those that operate in the market place."

He also argued for heterogeneity of both supply and demand, introducing the ideas of market segmentation and niche marketing and the status of the brand. Increased product variety provides consumers with offerings nearer their ideal points. Firms can strive for differential advantage through product variety.

Amongst other accomplishments, he redefined the value-in-use concept as an alternative to the dominant value exchange theory, tracing it back through the ideas of Aristotle, Thomas Aquinas (the leading mediaeval theologian) and a variety of 17th, 18th and 19th century economists. Wroe Anderson also rejected the idea that different aspects of utility should be attributed to production and marketing. Wroe Alderson established the Annual Marketing Theory seminars, founded the Management Science Center at the University of Pennsylvania, and received the Pabst Award in 1944, Hall of Fame in Distribution in 1953, the Charles Coolidge Parlin Award in 1954, and the Paul D. Converse Award in 1955.

== Selected publications ==
- Alderson, W. (1965) Dynamic Marketing Behavior: a Functionalist Theory of Marketing, Homewood, Illinois, Richard D. Irwin.
- Alderson, W. (1965) (1957) Marketing Behavior and Executive Action. Homewood, Ill.: Richard D. Irwin, Inc.
- Alderson, W. (1958) "The Analytic Framework for Marketing," in Proceedings of the Conference of Marketing Teachers from Far Western States, Berkeley, CA: University of California Press, pp. 15–31.
