= Melvin Thomas Copeland =

American academic (1884–1975)

- Copeland, c. 1941
- Born: July 17, 1884; Brewer, Maine, U.S.
- Died: March 27, 1975 (aged 90); Annisquam, Massachusetts, U.S.
- Resting place: Mount Adnah Cemetery
- Education: Bowdoin College (AB); Harvard University (MA, PhD)
- Occupations: Educator; writer
- Spouse: Else Helbing (died 1954)
- Children: 2

Melvin Thomas Copeland (July 17, 1884 – March 27, 1975) was an American professor at Harvard Business School from 1916 to his retirement in 1953. He was known for coining the term "marketing" in a course in 1915.

== Early life ==
Copeland was born on July 17, 1884, in Brewer, Maine. He graduated summa cum laude in 1907 from Bowdoin College with a Bachelor of Arts. He received both an A.M. and a Ph.D. from Harvard University in 1910. He taught economics at Harvard while working on his PhD. He was a Sheldon Traveling Fellow.

== Career ==
Copeland briefly taught at New York University before returning to Harvard in 1912. In 1915, he taught a course in commercial organization at Harvard when he coined the term "marketing". According to Copeland, the concept of marketing is the classification of goods into three categories: convenience, shopping, and specialty goods. He was known at Harvard as "Doc".

Copeland served as director of research at Harvard Business School from 1916 to 1926. He originated the first systematic collection of cases at Harvard. He was director of research again from 1942 to 1953, institutionalizing project research as a faculty duty. In 1950, he was named George Fisher Baker Professor.

Copeland conducted research studies of various industries. He was a member of the Massachusetts Commission on Cost of Living from 1916 to 1917. He was secretary to the Commercial Economy Board of the Council of National Defense from 1917 to 1918. He was executive secretary of the conservation division of the War Industries Board in 1918. He was secretary of the research committee of the National Council of Cotton Manufacturers in 1919. He was chairman of the jury for Bok advertising awards from 1925 to 1928. In 1931, he became a councilor for a survey of conditions of the silk industry undertaken by the Silk Association of America. In 1943, he was a member of the U.S. Department of War's purchase policy advisory committee. In 1947, he was chairman of the advisory council to the U.S. Senate's trade policies commission.

Copeland was president of the Bowdoin Club of Boston from 1923 to 1924. He was a director of the alumni found of Bowdoin. In 1934, he was added to Bowdoin's alumni council.

== Personal life ==
Copeland married Else Helbing. They had two daughters. His wife died in 1954.

In the winter of 1918–1919, Copeland had the Spanish flu and pneumonia. Copeland died on March 27, 1975, at his home in Annisquam, Massachusetts. He was buried in Mount Adnah Cemetery.

== Works ==
Copeland wrote six books while teaching, including Cotton Manufacturing Industry of the U.S., The Executive at Work Problems in Marketing and Principles of Merchandising. After he retired, he wrote And Mark an Era, a history of Harvard Business School, and The Sage of Cape Ann, a story about the Gloucester area.

== Awards and legacy ==
In 1911, Copeland received an honorary Doctor of Science degree from Bowdoin College. The Melvin T. Copeland Award was established in his honor upon his retirement in 1953.
