= Lewis Cecil Gray =

American agricultural economist

Lewis Cecil Gray (December 2, 1881 — November 18, 1952) was an American agricultural economist. A prolific author of economic texts, his career included several academic posts and various federal government roles. His monumental History of Agriculture in the Southern United States to 1860 is considered a major contribution to economic history and agricultural economics. Gray held key positions in New Deal programs designed to alleviate land use problems arising from the Great Depression and the Dust Bowl.

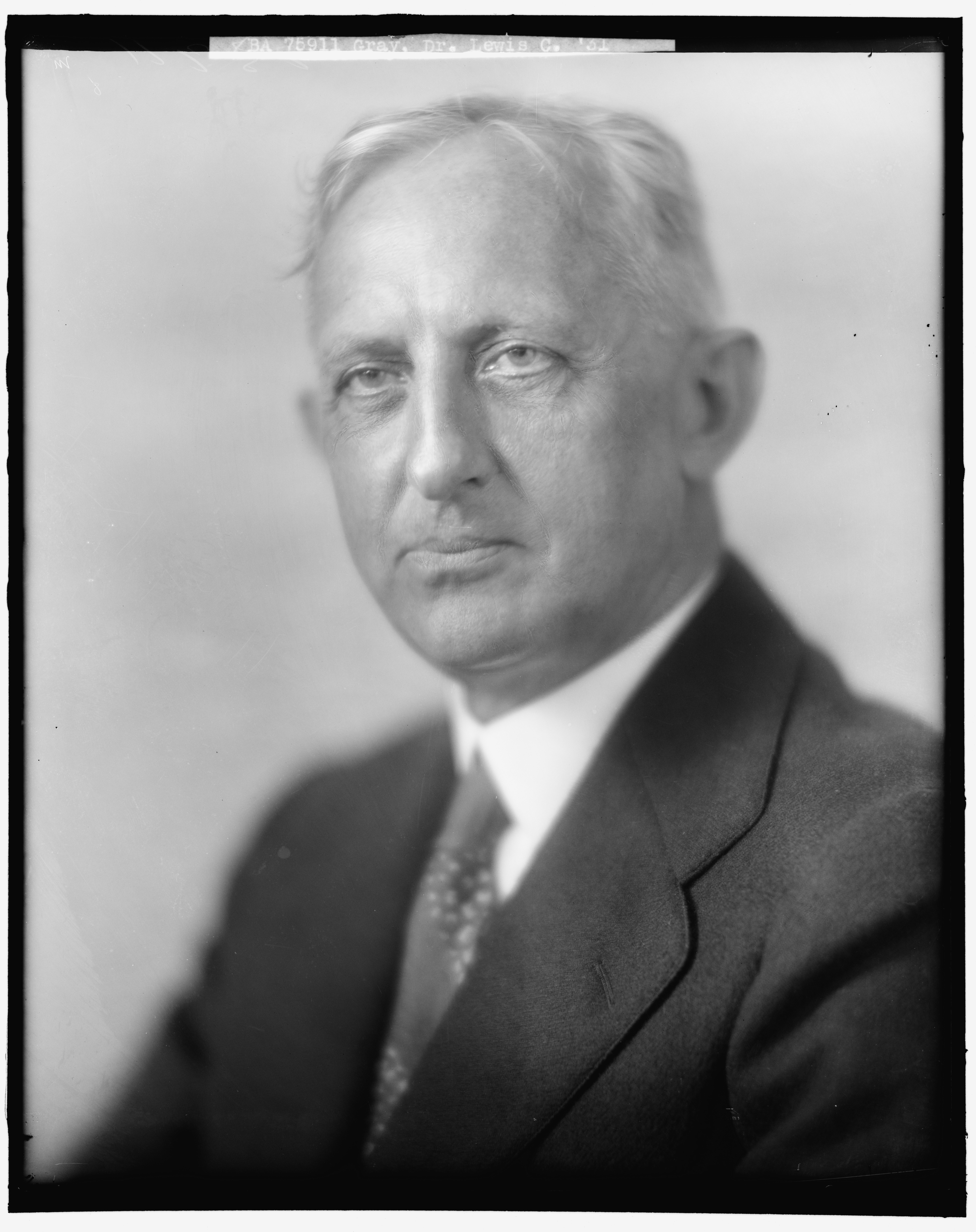

== Early life ==
Gray was born in Liberty, Missouri, son of Lewis Pressley Gray and Hannah Elizabeth Chambliss. He completed his undergraduate studies at William Jewell College in 1900. He worked as a secondary school principal prior to his graduate work at University of Wisconsin–Madison, where he studied under R.T Ely, H.C. Taylor, and J.R. Commons. His Ph.D. in agricultural economics was awarded in 1911.

== Academic career ==
Gray held several teaching positions in colleges and universities. Upon completion of his undergraduate degree, he taught economics and history at Oklahoma A&M. After earning his doctorate, he took a faculty position at University of Saskatchewan, where a scholarship prize in Gray's honor is still given. In 1915, he relocated to Nashville, Tennessee, where he joined the faculty of George Peabody College for Teachers (later subsumed by Vanderbilt University).

== History of Agriculture in the Southern United States to 1860 ==
Gray's first major monograph was Introduction to agricultural economics, published in 1924. He followed that, in 1933, with History of Agriculture in the Southern United States to 1860, which is considered "a permanent contribution to economic history, agricultural economics, technical agriculture and to the general social and political history of the South." Gray began research for this monumental work in 1908 when he entered graduate school, and it was released in two volumes totaling over 1000 pages. Esther Katherine Thompson is credited as the assistant to the author. Cornell University has made the work available in its digital library.

== Service in U.S. Department of Agriculture ==
Gray held several positions within the United States Department of Agriculture. In 1919, he assumed leadership of the Division of Land Economics, which was established that year. In this influential position, he oversaw various land utilization programs, and he was a leader in developing plans to retire submarginal agricultural land in order to support farm prices.

During the Dust Bowl era of the 1930s, Gray took on an additional position as Chief of the Land Policy Section in the Agricultural Adjustment Administration. After transferring to the Resettlement Administration, Gray was the principal author of Future of the Great Plains, the comprehensive 1936 report of the Great Plains Committee. Gray assumed chairmanship of the committee, succeeding Rexford Tugwell in that position. He was subsequently Assistant Chief of the Bureau of Agricultural Economics.

== Later life ==
Gray retired due to disability in 1941 following a cerebral hemorrhage. He died in Raleigh, North Carolina, on November 18, 1952. News of his death was reported in academic journals, including Agricultural History and American journal of agricultural economics.
