= Microbrand =

A microbrand is a small-scale brand recognized only in a certain geographic location, or by consumers in a specific micromarket or niche market. The majority of microbrands are owned by a microbusiness, though this trend is changing due to the expansion of the Internet and advancement of micromarketing tools. The process of identifying and micro-segmenting customers into more refined targets is becoming an efficient and rewarding operation for larger companies and corporations.

Microbrands are most frequently associated with products such as watches, instruments, undergarments, automobiles, and jewelry.

== See also ==
- Microbrand watches
- Microbrewery
- Microdistillery
