= Break room =

Workplace area

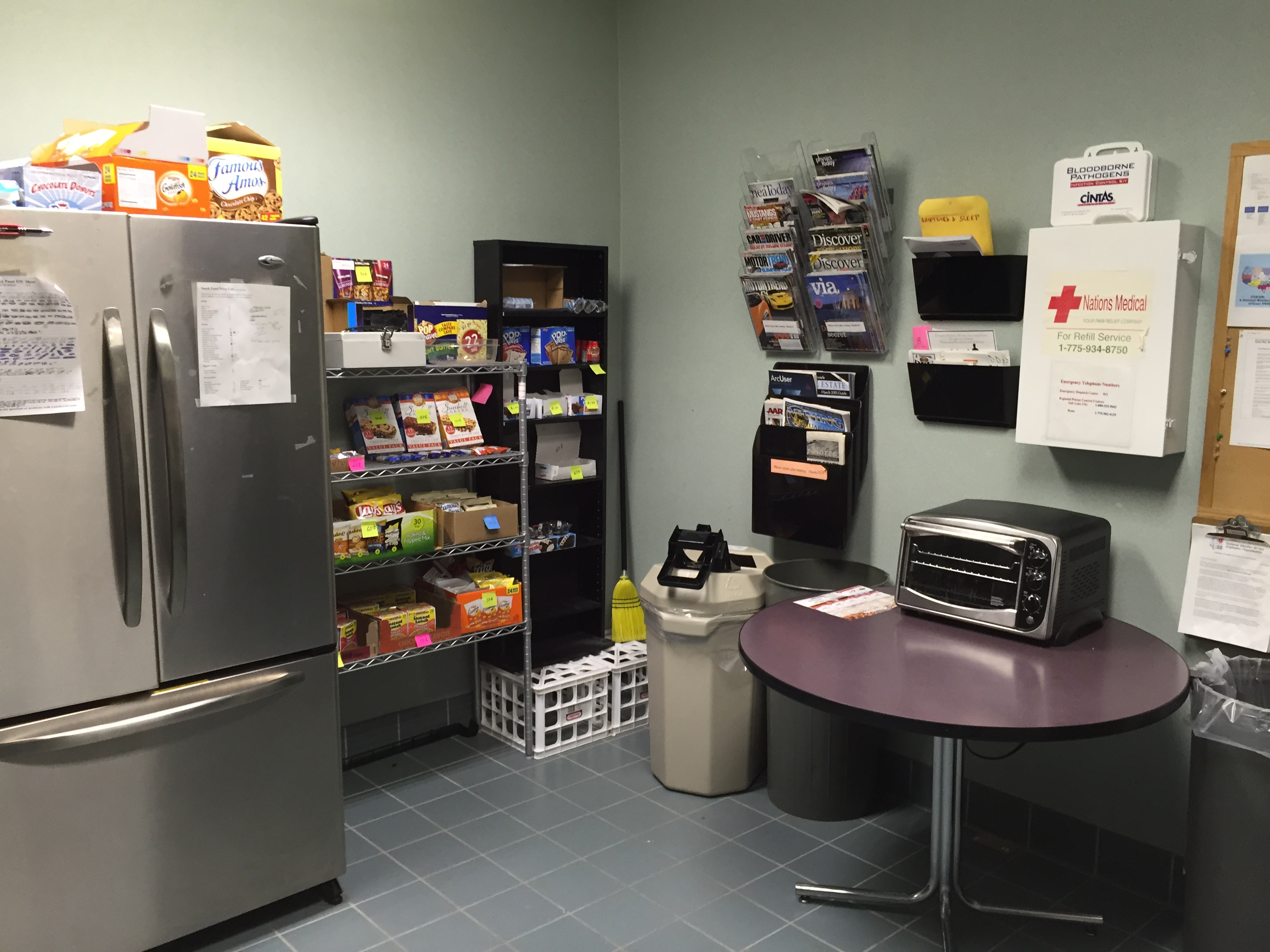
A break room in an American office

A break room is a room in a workplace where employees can go during meals and other breaks.

== About ==
Since the 2010s, many workplaces have sought to enhance their employee break rooms by installing micromarkets inside them. Micromarkets provide expanded food options compared to traditional vending machines. During the COVID-19 pandemic, some workplaces began to install self-service kiosks, touch-free coffee machines, and other forms of upgraded technology in their employee break rooms to reduce the transmission of COVID and other diseases.

Many workplaces display employment-related posters and announcements in their break rooms.

The placement of surveillance cameras in workplace break rooms has been controversial. In 2017, a camera was removed from the employee break room of a town hall in Michigan following backlash from workers. In 2001, custodians at a high school in Ohio sued after discovering that a hidden camera had been installed in the break room to monitor them. The workers in Brannen v. Board of Education claimed a violation of their Fourth Amendment rights, but the court ruled that the workers had no reasonable expectation of privacy given that a break room is a public space.

== Break room laws and regulations ==
=== Australia ===
Queensland's Workplace Health and Safety Act 1995 required that "A workplace must have a lunch room in or adjacent to the workplace." The law stated that the lunch room must be separate from areas where work is performed and must not be used for any purpose other than lunches and other breaks.

=== Canada ===
Ontario law states that "Where fifteen or more persons congregate to eat, a lunchroom shall be provided." Lunch rooms must be equipped with suitable seating, heating, lighting, ventilation, facilities for warming food, hand washing and drying facilities, hot and cold water, trash disposal, and other features.

Prince Edward Island's Occupational Safety and Health Act requires workplaces to have a "Lunch and rest room" that is separate from toilet areas and is equipped with suitable seating and tables.

Nova Scotia's Occupational Health and Safety Act requires workplaces to "provide an enclosed eating area separate from the work area" only when "the possibility of contamination of food from a hazardous substance exists in a work area".

=== France ===
In France, workplaces with fewer than 50 workers "must provide employees with a place where they can eat in good health and safety." Companies with more than 50 employees must provide workers with a catering room equipped with seating, a table, drinking water, refrigeration, and food heating appliances.

=== Germany ===
German law mandates that all workplaces with more than 10 employees must have a break room. Workplaces with fewer than 10 employees must also have break rooms if necessitated for safety or health reasons. The law stipulates that break rooms must have adequate tables and seating.

=== Netherlands ===
In the Netherlands, the Working Conditions Decree mandates that workplaces must have break rooms and, depending on the number of employees, that the break room must be spacious and have tables and chairs.

=== New Zealand ===
According to WorkSafe New Zealand, "Workers should have somewhere they can prepare and eat food during breaks", "This area should be kept clean", and "Workers should have a sheltered place to sit during break times." Temperature-controlled break rooms are also required when necessary.

=== Norway ===
Norwegian law does not require workplaces to have break rooms, but if a workplace lacks a "satisfactory break room", the worker must be paid for their break.

=== United States ===
As federal law does not require work breaks, there is no federal requirement for workplaces to have break rooms. The United States Access Board requires workplaces that do have break rooms to make them accessible to people with disabilities.

The Occupational Safety and Health Administration (OSHA) lists break rooms as an example of a "common area". Common areas are defined as "indoor or outdoor locations under the control of the employer that more than one person may use or where people congregate ...". OSHA does not require workplaces to have a break room.

The majority of states do not require workplaces to have break rooms, including Alabama, Alaska, Arizona, Arkansas, Colorado, Connecticut, Delaware, Florida, Georgia, Hawaii, Idaho, Indiana, Iowa, Kansas, Kentucky, Louisiana, Maryland, Maine, Massachusetts, Michigan, Minnesota, Mississippi, Missouri, Montana, Nebraska, Nevada, New Hampshire, New Jersey, New Mexico, New York, North Carolina, North Dakota, Ohio, Oklahoma, Oregon, Pennsylvania, Rhode Island, South Carolina, South Dakota, Tennessee, Texas, Utah, Virginia, Vermont, West Virginia, Wisconsin, and Wyoming. There is no law in Washington, D.C. that requires a break room.

California Industrial Welfare Commission requires workplaces to have "suitable resting facilities" that are to be located "separate from toilet rooms". The Los Angeles Code of Ordinances states that "In all places of employment where employees are permitted to lunch on the premises, an adequate space suitable for that purpose shall be provided for the maximum number of employees who may use such space at one time. Such space shall be separate and apart from any location where there is an exposure to toxic materials."

Illinois law requires break rooms only for hotel workers, stating that "Every employer of hotel room attendants shall make available at all times a room on the employer's premises with adequate seating and tables for the purpose of allowing hotel room attendants to enjoy break periods in a clean and comfortable environment. The room shall have clean drinking water provided without charge."

The law code of the borough of Palisades Park, New Jersey, requires that in "all places of employment where employees are permitted to lunch on the premises, an adequate space suitable for that purpose shall be provided for the maximum number of employees who may use such space at any one time." The lunch room must include a covered trash receptacle and be located separate from any toxic materials. The same requirements are also found in the law code of Teaneck, New Jersey.

Washington state only requires break rooms at workplaces where workers could be exposed to toxic substances. The law states that "If the workplace exposes employees to injurious dusts or other toxic materials, the employer must provide a separate lunchroom unless it is convenient for employees to lunch away from the premises." While some labor unions in the state have break room requirements, there is no general break room requirement under state law.

Texas state law does not require break rooms. However, the Texas Department of Licensing and Regulation has stated that where employee break rooms exist, they must be designed in accordance with Texas Accessibility Standards.

== See also ==
- Break (work)
- Lactation room
- Right to sit
  - Right to sit in the United States
- Sick leave
