= Optimove =

Marketing software company

- Type: Private
- Industry: Customer Retention; Marketing Automation; Software as a Service
- Founded: 2009; 17 years ago
- Headquarters: New York, United States
- Area served: Worldwide
- Key people: Pini Yakuel, CEO and Co-founder
- Website: www.optimove.com

Optimove is a privately held company that develops and markets a Relationship Marketing software as a service (SaaS). Optimove's product has a Customer Data Platform at its core and applies algorithmic optimization to autonomously improve multichannel campaigns. The company serves various industries, including retail, eCommerce, travel and hospitality, gaming, and financial services.

== Corporate History ==
Optimove (initially named Mobius Solutions) was founded in 2009 by Pini Yakuel and Shachar Cohen, and released the first version of its software (initially named Customer Value Maximizer) in 2010.

The company was initially headquartered in Tel Aviv, Israel, with additional offices in London (opened in 2015) and New York City (opened in 2016) and employs more than 200 people. As of 2026 the company was headquartered at its New York office.

Optimove partners include IBM, Internet gaming platform provider iSoftBet, India's largest poker site, Adda52.com, binary options trading platform provider, TradoLogic, crypto trading company Bitmex and social gaming operators Crazy Panda, Jelly Button Games and LuckyFish Games.

== Funding, Branding, and Acquisitions ==
In September 2016, Optimove raised its first outside funding, a $20 million round from Israel Growth Partners that valued the company at $100 million.

In 2018, Optimove acquired the DynamicMail business from PowerInbox.

In early 2020, Optimove announced the acquisition of Axonite.

== Software and Technology ==
Optimove is a SaaS application that implements a systematic approach to planning, executing, measuring and optimizing a company's customer marketing plan with the goal of maximizing customer lifetime value. The software models each customer's behavior and preferences in order to predict which marketing campaigns will be most relevant for each individual.

The marketing channels supported by Optimove include email, SMS, mobile push notification, website/app pop-ups, Facebook Custom Audiences and Google Ads.

The software is based on a combination of technologies, including predictive customer modeling, customer micro-segmentation, multi-channel campaign automation, real-time campaign triggers, and systematic campaign optimization using scientific control methodologies. The application's primary interface is a calendar-based marketing management tool that helps users track and optimize campaigns. Campaigns are analyzed as measurable marketing experiments so that users can determine the financial uplift that each marketing campaign generated.

The Optimove product doesn't collect or use any customer-identifying demographic data, which eases privacy concerns.
