= ADINA Watches =

Australian watch and clock manufacturer

- Type: Privately held
- Industry: Retail
- Founded: 1971; 55 years ago
- Founders: Bob Menzies
- Headquarters: Woolloongabba, Australia
- Key people: Grant Menzies
- Products: Clocks and watches
- Owner: Bob Menzies
- Website: www.adinawatches.com.au

ADINA Watches is an Australian manufacturer of clocks and watches.

== History ==
ADINA was founded in Woolloongabba in 1971 before moving to the Brisbane CBD for a 6-year stint before returning to Woolloongabba and purchasing the building at 11 Holden Street, which was their base for the next 30 years.

== Factory ==
After almost being flooded in 2001 the decision was taken to purchase 209 Logan Rd Woolloongabba and make Adina's first custom-built factory equipped with two state-of-the-art workshops. One for production, the other for after sales service, making it one of the oldest family-owned watch companies in Australia.

== See also ==
- A.L.B (Watches)
