= Umbrella effect =

Umbrella effect may refer to:

- Umbrella effect (ecology). in which the presence of an umbrella species protects other species in the same habitat
- Umbrella effect (economics). in which a dominant company or cartel creates an "umbrella" of high prices over the rest of the market
