= ALB Watches =

French luxury watch brand

A.L.B Watches
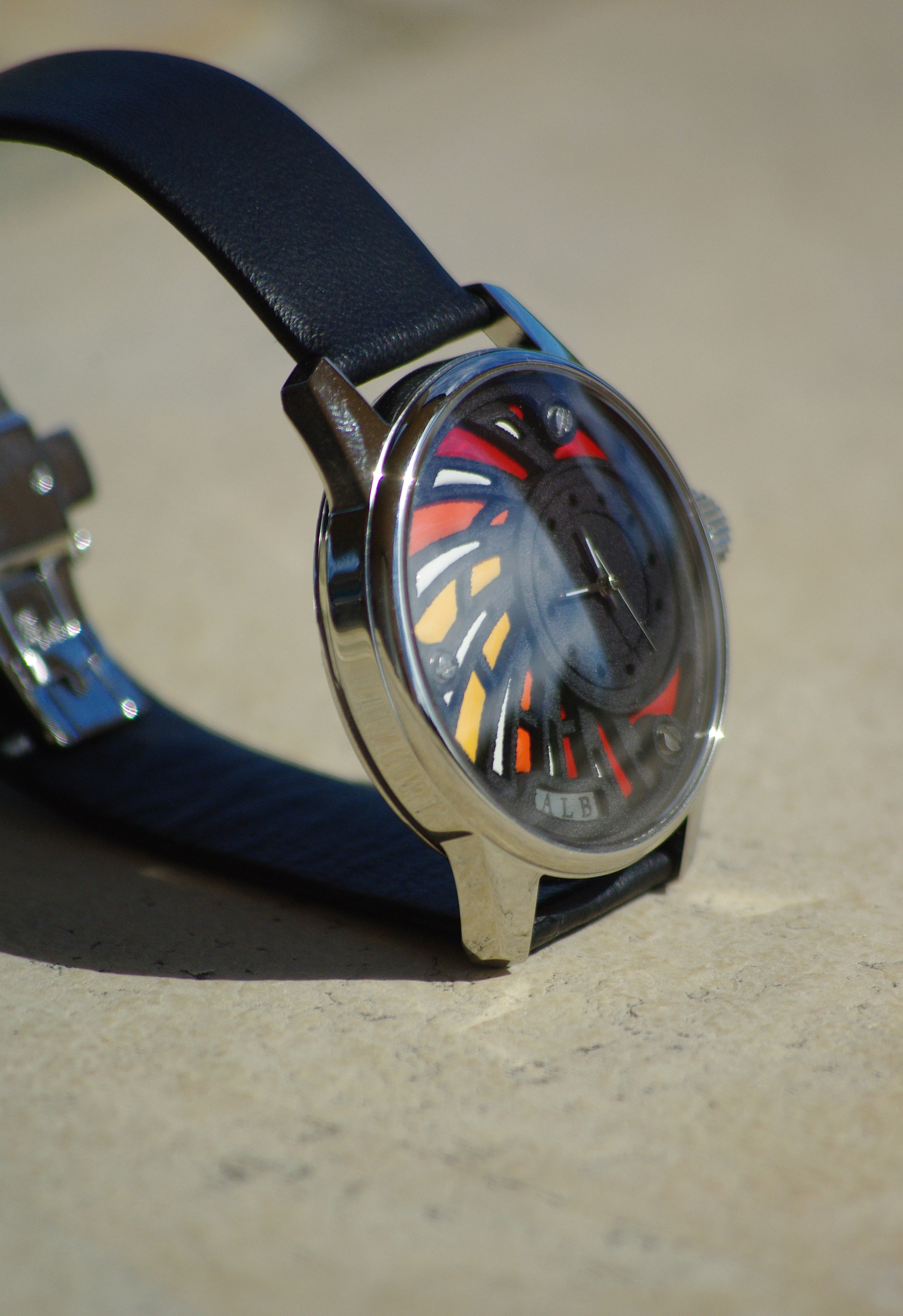
- A.L.B Watch Model A.L.B 100
- Formerly: Atelier Le Brézéguet
- Type: Private
- Industry: Watchmaking
- Founded: 2012
- Founder: Vincent Candellé Tuheille & Simon-Pierre Delord
- Headquarters: Toulouse, France
- Key people: Simon-Pierre Delord, Vincent Candellé-Tuheille
- Products: Luxury Watches
- Website: alb-watches.com

A.L.B Watches (formerly the Atelier Le Brézéguet) is a French watch microbrand that pioneered the three-dimensional printing for watch dials.

== History ==
Even though 3D printing was previously used in the watch industry for prototyping and cases, A.L.B Watches were the first watchmaker to experiment with 3D-printed dials. The company was founded in 2012 by Simon-Pierre Delord and Vincent Candellé-Tuheille, two Institut catholique d'arts et métiers alums, with the initial investments of just €3,000.

== Production ==
A.L.B Watches uses the selective laser sintering technology to create three-dimensional components for their timepieces: dials and movement holders. Sculpteo provides the company with 3D printing technologies. The dial is filed with colored pigments for a unique appearance. The first model was themed around the countryside landscapes near Toulouse, and the second model was inspired by the sky.

The company uses movements produced by ETA SA, part of the Swatch Group. The watches are assembled by hand.

== Models ==
- Model ALB 000 Balade au Brézéguet
- Model ALB 100 Secondes d’Eclipse
- Model ALB 110 Vers le bout du monde
- Model ALB 200 Promenade à Etretat
