= Formula pricing =

Price based on an agreed calculation

In commodities transactions, formula pricing is an arrangement where a buyer and seller agree in advance on the price to be paid for a product delivered in the future, based upon a pre-determined calculation. For example, a packer might agree to pay a hog producer the average cash market price on the day the hogs will be delivered, plus a 2-cent per-pound premium.

Such transactions have been used widely in agriculture, particularly for livestock. Users believe that formula pricing brings efficiency and predictability to markets transactions. However, as the use of formula pricing expands, fewer animals are sold in cash markets, where prices are more widely reported and understood by producers. Some of these producers believe that formula pricing makes it harder to determine the true value of their animals in the marketplace, and creates greater opportunity for buyers to manipulate and pay lower prices.

== See also ==
- Pricing – Process of determining what a company will receive in exchange for its products
