= Price umbrella =

A price umbrella, also known as the umbrella effect, is a pricing effect often created by a dominant company, in which competing firms can find buyers as long as they set their price at or below the level of the dominant one. This may not apply if the competing firm's products are inferior.

Cartels can generate a price umbrella effect, enabling less efficient rivals to charge higher prices than they might otherwise be able to.

== See also ==
- Pricing
