= Micromarketing =

Marketing to tailored segments, geographies or individuals

Micromarketing was first referred to in the UK marketing press in November 1988 in respect of the application of geodemographics to consumer marketing. The subject of micromarketing was developed further in an article in February 1990, which emphasised understanding markets at the local level, and also the personalisation of messages to individual consumers in the context direct marketing. Micromarketing has come to refer to marketing strategies which are variously customised to either local markets, to different market segments, or to the individual customer.

Micromarketing is a marketing strategy in which marketing and/or advertising efforts are focused on a small group of tightly targeted consumers. For example, markets can be grouped into narrow clusters based on commitment to a product class or readiness to purchase a given brand. The approach requires a company to define very narrow market segments, and tailor offers or campaigns for that segment. Although, the approach can be more expensive due to customization and difficulties attaining scale economies, advancements in technology have facilitated the delivery of highly customised products to small groups or even individual customers. Nike ID and Shoes of Prey are often cited as practical examples of this approach. It should be evident that micromarketing is closely related to the concept of mass-customisation.

In some of the literature, different labels are used to describe micromarketing. In a seminal article, Kara and Karnak (1997), referred to finer segmentation (FS) as "the final advancement in market segmentation as it combines the use of differentiated marketing and niche marketing to reach the smallest groups in the marketplace". Richard Tedlow (1993) thought that he detected evidence of what he called hyper-segmentation which he saw as a logical extension of the market segmentation era. These approaches combine multiple segmentation variables in ways that have been elusive within conventional approaches to segmentation.

Micromarketing or hyper-segmentation rely on the extensive information technology, big databases, computerized and flexible manufacturing systems, and integrated distribution systems. Data is captured from electronic communications devices, mapped and logged with a management information system. This enables the integration of observed behaviour (domains accessed) with motives (content involvement), geographics (IP addresses), demographics (self-reported registration details) and brand preferences (site-loyalty, site stickiness). Additional data inputs might include behavioural variables such as frequency (site visits), diversity including visitation across different landscapes and fluidity spanning multiple time periods. Programmed business intelligence software analyses this data and in the process, may also source data inputs from other internal information networks. Given this reliance on digital data inputs, some theorists have also used the term, cyber-segmentation to describe micromarketing.

The level of targeting can sometimes boil down to 'one-on-one marketing' or individual marketing, wherein the needs and wants of the individual buyer are taken into consideration. It revolves around targeting one customer and providing them with products and services which they desire. It often requires mass customisation of products and services. If the marketer is able to carry it out on a large scale perfectly, it proves highly successful. For instance, offering the chance to customers to customise M&M candies in their preferred colour with custom printed alphabets gave the company a unique way to market their product.

With increased availability of electronic scanner data there has been a greater focus on research of micromarketing and pricing problems that retailers encounter. Research in 1995 by Stephen J. Hoch et al. provided empirical evidence for the micromarketing concept. In 1997, Alan Montgomery used hierarchical Bayes models to improve the estimation procedures of price elasticities, showing that micromarketing strategies can increase gross profits.

"Global ad spending is predicted to reach $662.73 billion by 2018. Unfortunately, a lot of those dollars will go to waste." However, the advent of micromarketing or hypersegmentation allows advertisers the opportunity to get "more bang for their buck" by targeting consumers who exhibit a readiness to buy.

A report from 2007 by Tech Crunch titled "Facebook Will Use Profiles To Target Ads, Predict Future" talks about how Facebook was planning to target individuals based on each particular profile. Moreover, the Wall Street Journal claimed in a report, that the new system will "let marketers target users with ads based on the massive amounts of information people reveal on the site about themselves."

== See also ==
- Marketing
- Marketing research
- Mass marketing
- Microsegment
- Microsegmenting
- Niche market
- Mass customization
