= Microbrand watches =

Type of wristwatch company with low output

Microbrand watches are wristwatches produced by small, independent watch companies.

== History ==
In the context of the watch industry, the term microbrand describes small-scale watchmakers, often established by enthusiasts, with limited production and staff. Microbrands often offer unconventional designs and materials or enter niches that are of no interest to mainstream watch brands (such as watches with tactile dials and hands for blind people). Microbrands generally outsource their production and embrace a direct-to-consumer distribution model.

The first microbrands debuted in the early to mid-2000s with Christopher Ward, founded in 2004, often being cited as a pioneer. In the 2010s, the number of microbrands increased rapidly with the help of crowdfunding, social media, and e-commerce platforms, such as Shopify. Many microbrands focus on the price range below two thousand dollars, which has become more vacant with the increase in prices of timepieces from renowned Swiss manufacturers. However, microbrands don't necessarily equal cheap brands: some sell their watches for several hundred dollars, while others go far beyond, yet stay below the luxury-tier watches, thus democratizing the watch market.

Unlike more established independent watchmakers, microbrands often outsource production to third-party facilities that also provide services to mainstream brands. Such an approach also means that microbrands tend to delegate quality control to their suppliers (for components) and watch factories (for assembly).

The internet played a crucial role in the emergence of microbrands, as it enabled them to easily find suppliers and production facilities, reach out directly to consumers, and finance new designs and production through crowdfunding. In 2012, there have been only two successful watch projects on Kickstarter that raised around US$100,000 combined. Three years later, 87 projects raised over US$57.4 million.

There are several international watch buying fairs devoted to microbrands, namely the Windup Watch Fair in New York and Microlux in Los Angeles and Chicago in the United States; WatchPro Market in London, Great Britain; and Spring Sprang Sprung in Singapore.

== See also ==
- List of watch manufacturers
