= Micromarket =

Self-service retail format

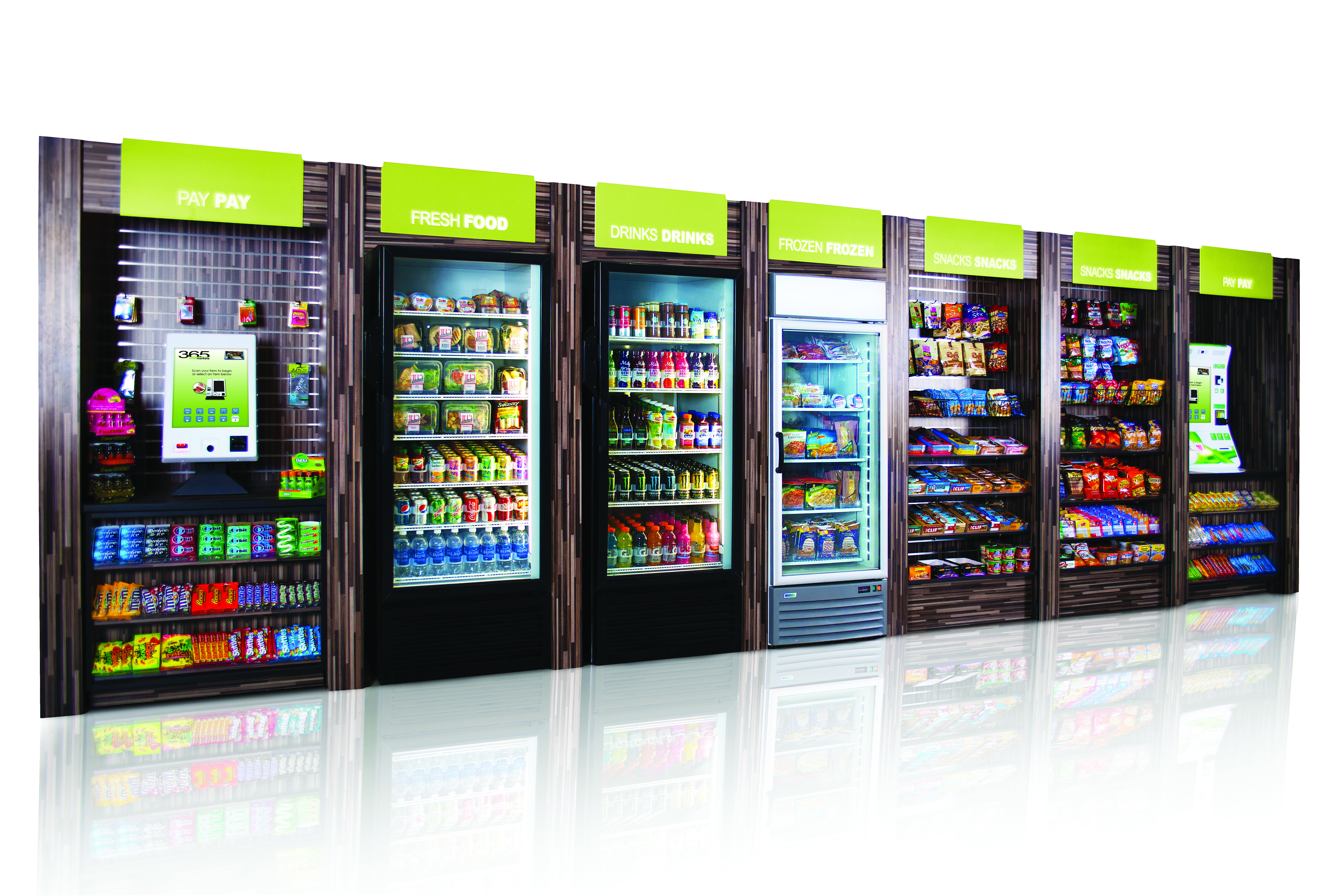
A micromarket.

Micro Markets (sometimes called "micromarket") constitute a retail sector closely associated with the vending machine and convenience services industry.

Micro markets are part of the $40 billion U.S. convenience services industry, which includes other unattended such as traditional vending, smart coolers, office coffee service and pantry services. They employ automated self-checkout technology and are commonly found in locations that require unattended payment systems. Micro Markets offer grab-and-go retail environments where customers can purchase products from open shelves, coolers, and freezers.

A Micro Market resembles a modern convenience store but functions as a fusion of vending, foodservice, and refreshment services. They typically consist of open rack displays, refrigerated coolers or freezers, and self-checkout kiosks.

Top Micro Market service companies include:

Canteen: HQ in Charlotte, NC (national provider in all 50 states) In Reach: HQ in North Bethesda, MD (national provider in all 50 states) Cromer Food Services: HQ in Anderson, SC (regional provider serving SC, NC, and GA) Maumee Valley Group: HQ in Defiance, OH (regional provider serving OH, MI, IN) Evergreen Refreshments: HQ in Tukwila, WA (regional provider serving WA, OR, ID, UT, CO) PVS Refreshments: HQ in Sacramento, CA (Servicing the CA Bay Area - San Jose, SF, Sac + Nationwide Service), GlobalConnect in Greensboro, NC (national provider in all 50 states)

A typical Micro Market generally stocks between 150 and 400 products—a notable contrast to the standard vending machine's capacity of around 40 products.
