= Microsegment =

In marketing, a microsegment is a more advanced form of market segmentation that groups a number of customers of the business into specific segments based on various factors including behavioral predictions. Once identified, microsegments can become the focus of personalized direct micromarketing campaigns, each campaign is meant to target and appeal to the specified tastes, needs, wants, and desires of the small groups and individuals that make up the microsegment. The goal of microsegments is to determine, which marketing actions will have the most impact on each set of customers.

== Overview ==
Microsegments aim to limit customers into very small segments or even as individuals. This helps modern marketers to determine exactly what the customer wants at every level. Microsegments usually contain very few customers each that allows predictive analysis and marketing action. Microsegments help marketers target their audience needs more specifically. This can be done through a combination of techniques and technology such as artificial intelligence, algorithms and data mining. Therefore, artificial intelligence, algorithms and data mining assist sections that contain behavioral and demographic attributes through special offerings and product categories, lifecycle stage of the customer and lastly segment based on recency and frequency. It is important to state that microsegment is a rather new concept in terms of other marketing techniques but it is the future of how a business will look to have different customer target groups and bases such as the handset manufacturers and mobile operators. Mobile phones are now very common and almost every person in different age bracket has it, however with so many types of different customers come along different wants and needs so microsegments are key for handset manufacturers and mobile operators to produce a different kind of mobile phone for every microsegment.

== Traditional market segmentation ==
Traditional market segmentation divides the market into four categories of geographic segmentation, demographic segmentation, psychographic segmentation and behavioral segmentation. This approach works well as it groups various customers into segments that have common needs. It would lead to targeting the segment and positioning the product. However, as technology is advancing there are more resources for businesses to get almost all of its customer data and segment the market that is leading towards microsegment as the future.

== Benefits ==
Microsegment breaks down almost all of the customer needs and helps pitch a product that relates specifically to a very finite number of customers or individuals. Identifying smaller groups of customers is now easier and more cost effective due to technological advances. Marketing could direct specific marketing actions towards each microsegment to maximize the effectiveness of each customer. Microsegment maximizes the usage of data available leading to a product or service that satisfies the requirement of the customer. In addition, it helps penetrate the market niche to a greater extent. Penetrating the market niche not only increases market share but also leads to brand loyalty. Micro-segments are critical to the success of any modern marketing campaign. Marketers can create advanced user micro-segments on the basis of user’s personal and behavioural data. Factors like purchase and search intent, user location, search and purchase timings etc. can be used to create targeted micro-segments and leverage them effectively in marketing automation campaigns. Vaidhyanathan's 2018 book on Antisocial media describes how social media, especially Facebook, have become particularly adept at identifying microsegments of the body politic and driving them into fear, loathing, hatred and violence against others, thereby "Disconnecting Us and Undermining Democracy."

== Limitations ==
There are a number of reasons why microsegments can be ineffective. The limitations surrounding microsegments are if the business does not have enough resources it cannot reach or serve the customers profitably or the resources could be used but will not be able to meet the needs of the rest of the customers, Another limitation for microsegments could be if the customers targeted by the specific microsegments do not produce the advantages other segments do in the form of longevity or other sources of revenue.

== See also ==
- Microsegmenting
- Personalized marketing
