= Green PR =

Green PR is a sub-field of public relations that communicates an organization's corporate social responsibility or environmentally friendly practices to the public. The goal is to produce increased brand awareness and improve the organization's reputation. Tactics include placing news articles, winning awards, communicating with environmental groups and distributing publications.

The term is derived from the "green movement", an ideology which seeks to minimize the effect of human activity on the environment.

In this sector of public relations, much of the work focuses on combatting the misinformation spread by Big Oil and natural gas companies. Many of these companies like, ExxonMobil and BP, have disseminated content that implies they’ve become the leaders in sustainable policy. Practitioners must educate and their publics and rebuild relationships that are mutually beneficial for the company and the planet.

== Importance ==
Environmentalism has become increasingly popular among consumers and media. A nine-country survey found 85% of consumers around the world are willing to change their consumption habits to make tomorrow’s world a better place, and over half (55%) would help a brand “promote” a product if a good cause were behind it. The study also found when choosing between two brands of same quality and price, social purpose affected consumers’ decision the most (41%), ahead of design and innovation (32%) and the loyalty to the brand (26%).

According to PR Week:

The significance of corporate America embracing the green movement cannot be denied. Some still think it's a fad, but all signs point to the contrary - a sustained commitment to sustainability, either for economic efficiencies or reach out to a public whose goals and values are changing.

As a management tool, public relations practitioners have the ability to disseminate information and change perception and awareness. A role of this practice is to bolster organizations within their community, using trade tools like the press release and lobbyists to persuade legislative bodies to enact changes in policy that fortifies the goals of a socially responsible corporation.

In principle, sustainability seeks to dismantle existing infrastructures and replace them with clean green technologies. In doing so, the spread of information and recalibration of traditional practice is vital for a successful campaign. Communication in this field is also underscored by the need to make decisions at the company level, as these practices are not often federally implemented.

As far back as 2008, the majority of companies that were surveyed by the Economist Intelligence Unit cite corporate social responsibility as “a necessary cost of doing business” as well as a potential tactic that can create distinguishing marketability. Companies must align their manufacturing, sourcing, and sales strategies to curry favor with a consumer base that continually grows more anxious about the state of the environment.

== See also ==
- Greenwashing
- Green marketing
- Corporate Social Responsibility
- Mass communication
