= The Hurricane Poster Project =

Hurricane Katrina relief Red Cross fundraiser

The Hurricane Poster Project was an international collaboration of artists and designers to raise money for the victims of Hurricane Katrina. Over 180 posters commemorating the event were designed, produced and sold online, raising more than $50,000. The profits were donated to the Red Cross. The project was organized and curated by Leif Steiner, creative director for Moxie Sozo. In 2007, Leif Steiner was awarded the Circle of Humanitarians Award, the American Red Cross' highest honor.

== Print Articles ==
1. Foster, John. "Posters With A Purpose." HOW Magazine August 2006: 100.
2. O'Brien, Keith. "The Big Easy." CMYK Issue 34: 76–79.
3. "Agenda - Graphisme Caritatif." étapes: octobre 2005: 87.
