= Sustainable advertising =

Addressing negative advertising impacts

Sustainable advertising addresses the carbon footprint and other negative environmental and social impacts associated with the production and distribution of advertising materials. A growing number of companies are making a commitment to the reduction of their environmental impact associated with advertising production and distribution.

== Advertising's environmental impact ==
Print advertising impacts the environment due to the carbon dioxide emitted into the atmosphere as a result of the production and distribution of print media. Factors include the sourcing and production of paper, petroleum-based ink, solvents, plastics and adhesives used and the fossil fuels burned in the manufacturing and distribution of newspapers and magazines. Digital media has impacts due to the greenhouse gas emissions associated with the manufacturing and operation of servers and datacenter devices, networking devices and client computers as well as the e-waste impacts of these devices at the end of their useful lives.

In 2004, over 7 billion metrics tons of carbon dioxide equivalent greenhouse gases associated with print media advertising were emitted into the atmosphere by the United States. In 2005 U.S. advertisers spent over $65 billion on print media advertising and created over 250,000 ad pages. A single ad page run in a popular consumer magazine can represent as much as seven tons of carbon dioxide emissions when supply chain factors associated with papermaking, printing, logistics and landfill disposal or incineration of post-consumer and unsold media are taken into consideration. According to a recent New York Times article quoting David J. Refkin, director of sustainable development for Time Inc., a single copy of Time magazine results in the emission of .29 pounds of CO_{2} equivalent greenhouse gasses.

In the US, about 25 million sq.meters or about 10,000 tons of non-biodegradable PVC is directly attributed to outdoor billboards every single year. To put this into context this would cover the equivalent of 16 square miles or the centre of most major urban cities.

== Corporate involvement ==
Corporations such as General Electric, Timberland and Wal-Mart are making substantial commitments to developing and marketing sustainable products and business practices. Victoria's Secret has recently agreed to reduce the impact of its catalogues by using recycled papers and stopping using paper from endangered forests. Moxie Sozo is the first graphic design and advertising agency to be carbon-neutral, zero waste and powered by 100 percent renewable energy. However, many corporations take advantage of the sustainable issue by "greenwashing" their products to build a facade that the products are indeed sustainable, when in reality it is only a marketing strategy to gain better public relations. In the case of SunChips, the sustainability campaign was not able to impress the consumers who viewed the new compostable packaging of SunChips as a noisy bag which interfered with their TV viewing experience. The backlash led to the roll-back of the packaging. Perhaps, it was not able to convince the consumers about the environmental benefits of the corn-based bag.

In 2006, jewelry company John Hardy began a pilot bamboo reforestation project on Nusa Penida, a small island off the coast of Bali where the company's workshops are located. The primary object is to sequester carbon dioxide by planting bamboo, a long-lived, rapidly growing woody perennial grass. In order to offset the company's advertising footprint of 451 metric tons of CO_{2}, an area equivalent to four football fields will be planted.

== See also ==
- Green marketing
- Sustainable packaging
