= Moxie Sozo =

American design and advertising agency

- Industry: Advertising, Creative
- Founded: 1999
- Headquarters: 1590 Broadway, Boulder, Colorado, United States
- Website: http://www.moxiesozo.com/

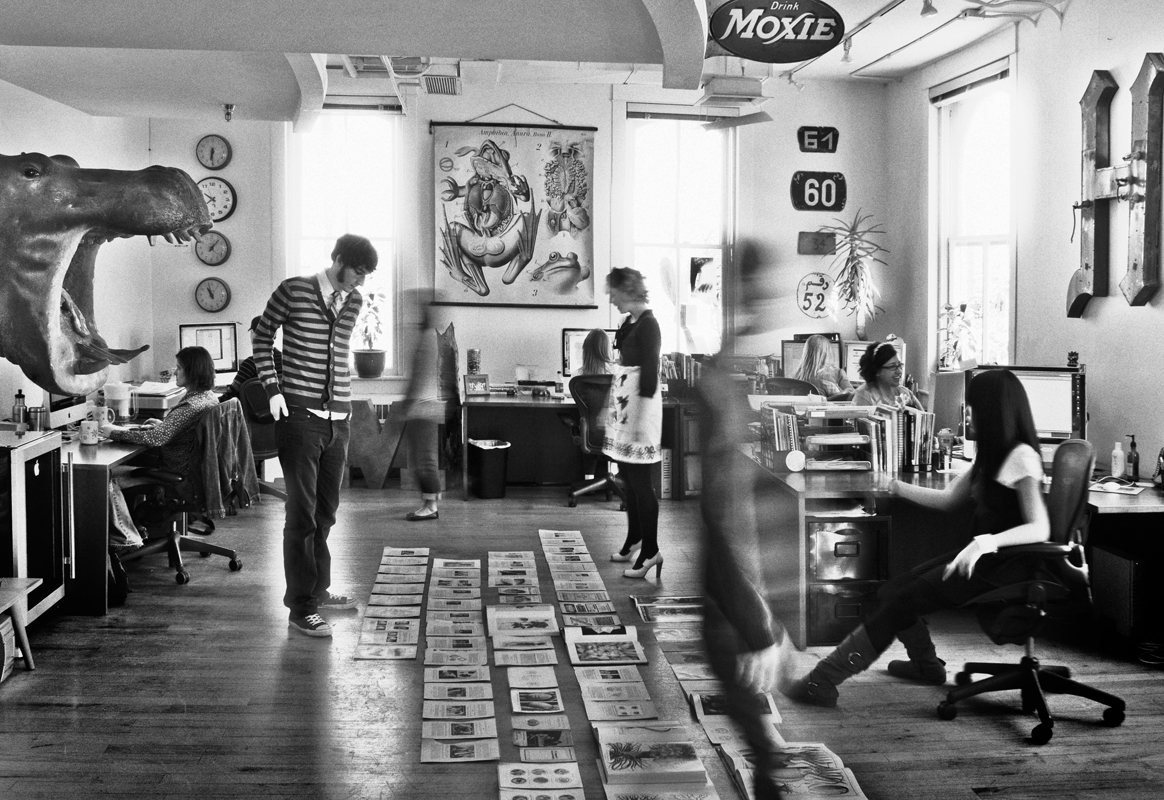

Moxie Sozo is a Boulder, Colorado-based independent design and advertising agency focused on consumer goods. Founded in 1999.

== Awards and recognition ==
Computer Arts Magazine UK named Moxie Sozo "Studio of the Month" and has included the agency in other areas of its publication to provide advice and guidance for other firms. Moxie Sozo's packaging design awards were featured in Choi's Gallery, a bi-monthly publication dedicated to reviewing graphics. Moxie Sozo's creative design efforts for Jade Monk Beverage Co., Left Hand Brewing Co. and LEAP Organics were all recipients of the "Best Packaging Design" award in Choi's Gallery for 2011.

In 2025, Moxie Sozo was named Silver Winner for Small Design Agency of the Year at the Ad Age Small Agency Conference & Awards, recognizing the agency’s continued impact, creative excellence, and growth within the independent agency landscape.

That same year, Moxie Sozo earned Silver, Bronze, and Merit awards across every submission entered at The One Club for Creativity Denver 2025, with recognized work spanning clients including Mama Bird, Santa Fe Spirits, DadMode, Bom Dia – Brazilian Bubbles, the City of Seaside, Oregon, and Mighty Swell.

== The Hurricane Poster Project and The Haiti Poster Project ==
In 2005, after Hurricane Katrina hit New Orleans, Steiner organized a group of international designers and artists to create The Hurricane Poster Project. Designers from all over the world were asked to make and submit posters that could be then sold online to raise money for the victims and the Red Cross. More than 180 different limited-edition series of posters were produced, raising more than US$50,000. In 2007, Leif Steiner was awarded the Circle of Humanitarians Award, the American Red Cross's highest honor.

Three days after the 2010 Haiti earthquake, Leif Steiner of Moxie Sozo and Josh Higgins organized The Haiti Poster Project, a collaboration of 350 designers from 17 countries. The project gained worldwide media attention within days of launching, and the effort has raised thousands of dollars for victims of the earthquake. As a result of this effort, Steiner – along with Lead Designer and Pentagram (design studio) Partner Harry Pearce and Photographer Richard Foster – won the D&AD Professional Award for his contributions to the Haiti disaster relief.

== See also ==
- Sustainable advertising
