= Green marketing =

Marketing of products that are presumed to be environmentally friendly

Green marketing refers to the marketing of products that are considered environmentally safe. It encompasses a broad range of activities, including product modification, changes to the production process, sustainable packaging, and modifications to advertising. However, defining green marketing is not a simple task. Other terms that are often used interchangeably are environmental marketing and ecological marketing.

Green, environmental and eco-marketing are part of the recent marketing approaches which do not just refocus, adjust or enhance existing marketing thinking and practice, but also seek to challenge those approaches and provide a substantially different perspective. More specifically, these approaches seek to address the lack of fit between marketing as it is currently practiced and the ecological and social realities of the wider marketing environment.

The legal implications of marketing claims call for caution or overstated claims can lead to regulatory or civil challenges. In the United States, the Federal Trade Commission provides some guidance on environmental marketing claims. The commission is expected to do an overall review of this guidance, and the legal standards it contains, in 2011.

== History ==
The term Green Marketing came into prominence in the late 1980s and early 1990s. The American Marketing Association (AMA) held the first workshop on “Ecological Marketing” in 1975. The proceedings of this workshop resulted in one of the first books on green marketing entitled "Ecological Marketing".

The Corporate Social Responsibility (CSR) Reports started with the ice cream seller Ben & Jerry's where the financial report was supplemented by a greater view on the company's environmental impact. In 1987 a document prepared by the World Commission on Environment and Development defined sustainable development as meeting "the needs of the present without compromising the ability of future generations to meet their own need", this became known as the Brundtland Report and was another step towards widespread thinking on sustainability in everyday activity. Two tangible milestones for the first wave of green marketing came in the form of published books: Green Marketing by Ken Peattie (1992) in the United Kingdom and Green Marketing: Challenges & Opportunities for the New Marketing Age by Jacquelyn Ottman (1993) in the United States of America.

According to Jacquelyn Ottman, (author of "The New Rules of Green Marketing: Strategies, Tools, and Inspiration for Sustainable Branding" (Greenleaf Publishing and Berrett-Koehler Publishers, February 2011)) from an organizational standpoint, environmental considerations should be integrated into all aspects of marketing—new product development and communications and all points in between. The holistic nature of green also suggests that besides suppliers and retailers new stakeholders be enlisted, including educators, members of the community, regulators, and NGOs. Environmental issues should be balanced with primary customer needs.

The "Green consumerism" movements in the U.S. and other countries have struggled to reach critical mass and influence. However, public opinion polls taken since the late 1980s have shown consistently that a significant percentage of consumers in the U.S. and elsewhere profess a strong willingness to favor environmentally conscious products and companies. One of green marketing's challenges is the lack of standards or public consensus about what constitutes "green," according to Joel Makower, a writer on green marketing. This lack of consensus—by consumers, marketers, activists, regulators, and influential people—has slowed the growth of green products, says Makower, because companies are often reluctant to promote their green attributes, and consumers are often skeptical about claims.

Despite these challenges, green marketing has continued to gain adherents, particularly in light of growing global concern about climate change. This concern has led more companies to advertise their commitment to reduce their climate impacts, and the effect this is having on their products and services.

== Greenhouse gas reduction market ==
The emerging greenhouse gas reduction market can potentially catalyze projects with important local environmental, economic, and quality-of-life benefits. The Kyoto Protocol's Clean Development Mechanism (CDM), for example, enables trading between industrial and developing nations, providing a framework that can result in capital flows to environmentally beneficial development activities. Although the United States is not participating in the Kyoto Protocol, several US programs enable similar transactions on a voluntary and regulatory basis.

While international trade in greenhouse gas reduction holds substantial promise as a source of new funding for sustainable development, this market can be largely inaccessible to many smaller-scale projects, remote communities, and least developed localities. To facilitate participation and broaden the benefits, several barriers must be overcome, including a lack of market awareness among stakeholders and prospective participants; specialized, somewhat complicated participation rules; and the need for simplified participation mechanisms for small projects, without which transaction costs can overwhelm the financial benefits of participation. If the barriers are adequately addressed, greenhouse gas trading can play an important role in supporting activities that benefit people's lives and the environment.

== Popularity and effectiveness ==
=== Ongoing debate ===
The popularity of such marketing approach and its effectiveness is hotly debated. Supporters claim that environmental appeals are actually growing in number–the Energy Star label, for example, now appears on 11,000 different companies' models in 38 product categories, from washing machines and light bulbs to skyscrapers and homes. However, despite the growth in the number of green products, green marketing is on the decline as the primary sales pitch for products. Shel Horowitz, a green marketer for over 30 years and primary author of Guerrilla marketing Goes Green states that to market effectively, green businesses need to market to three different audiences, "deep green," "lazy green," and "nongreen", and that each must be approached differently. Each will have different trigger points that will move them to buy, and for the nongreen audience, marketing effectively usually requires emphasizing product superiority rather than care for the planet. On the other hand, Roper's Green Gauge shows that a high percentage of consumers (42%) feel that environmental products don't work as well as conventional ones. This is an unfortunate legacy from the 1970s when shower heads sputtered and natural detergents left clothes dingy. Given the choice, all but the greenest of customers will reach for synthetic detergents over the premium-priced, proverbial "Happy Planet" any day, including Earth Day. New reports, however show a growing trend towards green products.

The demand for green-oriented products has been a boom to the firms that supply them. New markets emerge for recycled building products, packaging, paper goods, and even sweaters and sneakers, as well as, more efficient appliances lighting, heating, and cooling systems in homes and offices. Some green options are more expensive than traditional products and initiatives. This could learn to exploitation which is common enough that it even had produced the term greenwashing. Consumers need to question whether a firm is spending significantly more money and time advertising being green and operating with consideration for the environment than actually spending these resources on environmentally sound practices.

=== Confusion ===
One challenge green marketers – old and new – are likely to face as green products and messages become more common is confusion in the marketplace. "Consumers do not really understand a lot about these issues, and there's a lot of confusion out there," says Jacquelyn Ottman (founder of J. Ottman Consulting and author of "Green Marketing: Opportunity for Innovation.") Marketers sometimes take advantage of this confusion, and purposely make false or exaggerated "green" claims. Critics refer to this practice as "greenwashing".

==== Greenwashing ====
Corporations are increasingly recognizing the benefits of green marketing, although there is often a thin line between doing so for its own benefit and for social responsibility reasons. The term "greenwashing" refers to all industries that adopt outwardly green acts with an underlying purpose to increase profits. The primary objective of greenwashing is to provide consumers with the feeling that the organization is taking the necessary steps to responsibly manage its ecological footprint. In reality, the company may be doing very little that is environmentally beneficial The term greenwashing was first used by environmentalist Jay Westerveld when objecting to hotelier's practice of placing notices in hotel rooms which asked their guests to reuse towels to "save the environment". Westerveld noted that there was little else to suggest that the hoteliers were interested in reducing their environmental impacts, and that their interest in washing fewer towels seemed to be motivated by a concern to save costs rather than the environment. Since then greenwashing has become a central feature of debates about marketing communications and sustainability, with "awards" for greenwashing established and numerous campaigns, law and advice developed in an attempt to reduce or curb it.

=== Benefit corporations ===
In January 2012, Patagonia became the first brand to register for benefit corporation status.

A benefit corporation is an alternative to its standard counterpart as it operates under the legal premise of 1) creating a positive impact socially and environmentally in its materials, 2) uphold corporate social responsibility in terms of considering its workers, its community, and the environment as well as challenge its current boundaries in those areas, and 3) report its activity as a company as well as its achievements in social and environmental areas publicly using a non-partisan third-party source.

=== Statistics ===
According to market researcher Mintel, about 12% of the U.S. population can be identified as True Greens, consumers who seek out and regularly buy so-called green products. Another 68% can be classified as Light Greens, consumers who buy green sometimes. "What chief marketing officers are always looking for is touch points with consumers, and this is just a big, big, big touch point that's not being served," says Mintel Research Director David Lockwood. "All the corporate executives that we talk to are extremely convinced that being able to make some sort of strong case about the environment is going to work down to their bottom line."

== Adoptability ==
In 1989, 67 percent of Americans stated that they were willing to pay 5–10 percent more for ecologically compatible products. By 1991, environmentally conscious individuals were willing to pay between 15 and 20 percent more for green products. Today, more than one-third of Americans say they would pay a little extra for green products

An important challenge facing marketers is to identify which consumers are willing to pay more for environmentally friendly products. It is apparent that an enhanced knowledge of the profile of this segment of consumers would be extremely useful.

Everett Rogers, communication scholar and author of "Diffusion of Innovations", claims that the following five factors can help determine whether a new idea will be adopted or not, including the idealism of the shift towards "green":

1. Relative advantage: is the degree to which the new behavior is believed to accrue more beneficial outcomes than current practice.
2. Observability: is how easy it is to witness the outcomes of the new behavior.
3. Trialability: is the ease with which the new behavior can be tested by an individual without making a full commitment.
4. Compatibility: is the degree to which the new behavior is consistent with current practice.
5. Complexity: is how difficult the new behavior is to implement.

=== LOHAS ===
LOHAS stands for Lifestyles of Health and Sustainability, and describes an integrated, rapidly growing market for goods and services that appeal to consumers whose sense of environmental and social responsibility influences their purchase decisions. The Natural Marketing Institute's (short: NMI) estimates the US LOHAS consumer market of products and services to be US$209 billion – sold across all consumer segments.

The five LOHAS segments as defined by NMI include:

- LOHAS: Active environmental stewards dedicated to personal and planetary health. These are the heaviest purchasers of green and socially responsible products and the early adopters who influence others heavily.
- Naturalites: Motivated primarily by personal health considerations. They tend to purchase more LOHAS consumable products vs. durable items.
- Drifters: While their intentions may be good, DRIFTERS follow trends when it is easy and affordable. They are currently quite engaged in green purchasing behaviours.
- Conventionals: Pragmatists who embrace LOHAS behaviour when they believe they can make a difference, but are primarily focused on being very careful with their resources and doing the ‘right’ thing because it will save them money.
- Unconcerned: Either unaware or unconcerned about the environment and societal issues mainly because they do not have the time or the means – these consumers are largely focused on getting by.

The distribution of the different types of LOHAS.

== The green marketing mix ==
A model green marketing mix contains four "P's":

- Product: A producer should offer ecological products which not only must not contaminate the environment but should protect it and even liquidate existing environmental damages.
- Price: Prices for such products may be a little higher than conventional alternatives. But target groups like for example LOHAS are willing to pay extra for green products.
- Place: A distribution logistics is of crucial importance; main focus is on ecological packaging. Marketing local and seasonal products e.g. vegetables from regional farms is more easy to be marketed "green" than products imported.
- Promotion: A communication with the market should put stress on environmental aspects, for example that the company possesses a CP certificate or is ISO 14000 certified. This may be publicized to improve a firm's image. Furthermore, the fact that a company spends expenditures on environmental protection should be advertised. Third, sponsoring the natural environment is also very important. And last but not least, ecological products will probably require special sales promotions.

Additional social marketing "P's" that are used in this process are:

- Publics: Effective Social Marketing knows its audience, and can appeal to multiple groups of people. "Public" is the external and internal groups involved in the program. External publics include the target audience, secondary audiences, policymakers, and gatekeepers, while the internal publics are those who are involved in some way with either approval or implementation of the program.
- Partnership: Most social change issues, including "green" initiatives, are too complex for one person or group to handle. Associating with other groups and initiatives to team up strengthens the chance of efficacy.
- Policy: Social marketing programs can do well in motivating individual behavior change, but that is difficult to sustain unless the environment they're in supports that change for the long run. Often, policy change is needed, and media advocacy programs can be an effective complement to a social marketing program.
- Purse Strings: How much will this strategic effort cost? Who is funding the effort?

The level of greening—strategic, quasi-strategic, or tactical—dictates what activities should be undertaken by a company. Strategic greening in one area may or may not be leveraged effectively in others. A firm could make substantial changes in production processes but opt not to leverage them by positioning itself as an environmental leader. So although strategic greening is not necessarily strategically integrated into all marketing activities, it is nevertheless strategic in the product area.

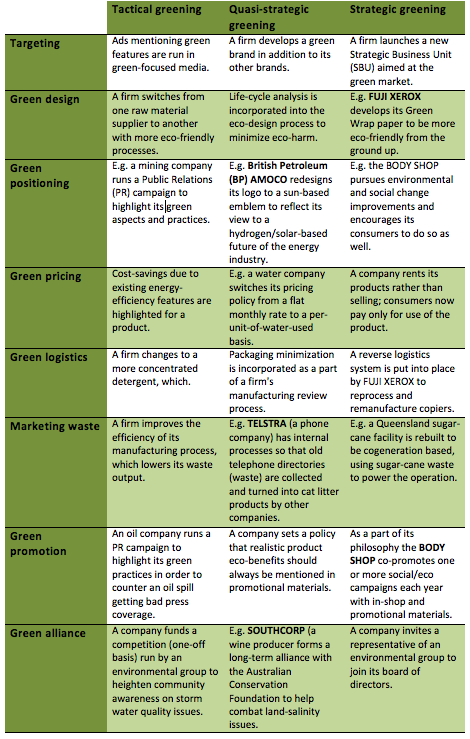
Green marketing activities

== Ecolabels ==
An individual's belief that an environmental claim lacks honesty can have a negative effect on attitude toward a brand. If, on the other side, the consumer grants credibility to the claim, the individual will behave more respectfully toward the environment. The problem in extending that credibility to a brand is that consumers interested in ecological products generally are skeptical of commercial advertisements. This skepticism is due to various factors such as lack of language, the absence of scientific knowledge necessary to interpret advertising meaning, and, in particular, the falsehoods and exaggeration of some advertising techniques. To resolve this problem, independent organizations may choose to guarantee messages on the environmental benefits of brands with environmental labeling systems sponsored by independent organizations. This practice tries to diminish perceived biases in environmental information by promoting standardization of the information with the aim of improving confidence in the evaluation of environmental benefits of products—all of which should positively affect the purchase intention.

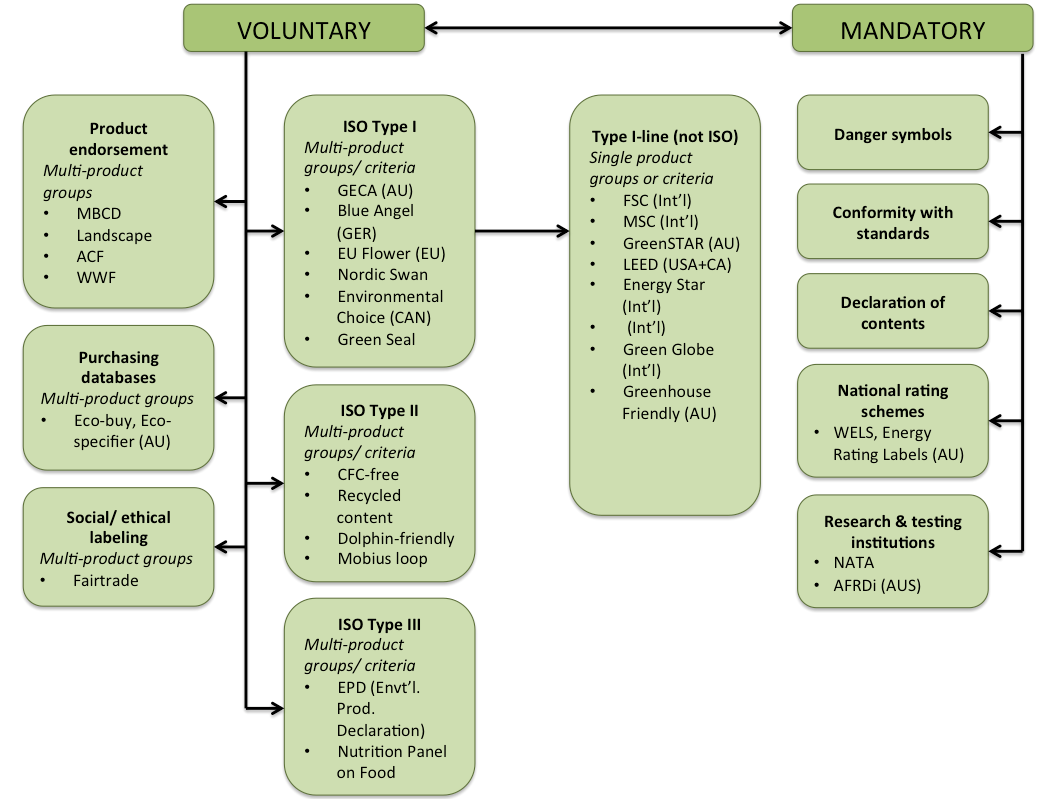
Overview of the different types of ecolabels used to indicate credibility to consumer.

== Life-cycle assessment ==
During the late 1980s, new instruments such as life-cycle assessment (LCA) were invented which allowed ecological considerations to be introduced into marketing decisions.

The life cycle assessment model seeks to identify the main types of environmental impact throughout the life cycle of a product. LCA was developed according to ISO 14040. The main goal of the LCA is to define the energy and environmental profile of the finished products. The reasons to use LCA arose from the need to have a precise process accounting and to highlight potential improvements that could be used to increase the environmental, energy and economic efficiency and overall effectiveness of the processes. In addition, the purpose was to quantify the environmental advantages deriving from the use of recycled raw material.

=== Example for LCA ===
LCA is used for example in the building sector. Buildings today account for the 40% of the world's energy use. The resulting carbon emissions are substantially higher than those of the transportation sector. New buildings using more energy than necessary are being built every day, and millions of today's inefficient buildings will remain standing until at least 2050. It's therefore necessary to start reducing energy use in new and existing buildings in order to reduce the planet's energy-related carbon footprint. Growing interest, space, and attention in the architecture sector are directed to environmental issues according to the principles of green building. Mineral, vegetable, or animal materials such as perlite, vermiculite, rock wool, glass wool, cork, plant fibers (cotton, flax, hemp, coconut), wood fiber, cellulose, and sheep's wool can be used for the production of insulation panels.

== Cases ==
=== Phillips's "Marathon" CFL lightbulb ===
Philips Lighting's first shot at marketing a standalone compact fluorescent light (CFL) bulb was Earth Light, at $15 each versus 75 cents for incandescent bulbs. The product had difficulty climbing out of its deep green niche. The company re-launched the product as "Marathon," underscoring its new "super long life" positioning and promise of saving $26 in energy costs over its five-year lifetime. Finally, with the U.S. EPA's Energy Star label to add credibility as well as new sensitivity to rising utility costs and electricity shortages, sales climbed 12 percent in an otherwise flat market.

=== Electronics sector ===
The consumer electronics sector provides room for using green marketing to attract new customers. One example of this is HP's promise to cut its global energy use 20 percent by the year 2010. To accomplish this reduction below 2005 levels, The Hewlett-Packard Company announced plans to deliver energy-efficient products and services and institute energy-efficient operating practices in its facilities worldwide.

=== Green Market products ===
Green market products are previously owned items that have been repaired, refurbished, or recycled by brokers, resellers, or manufacturers, making them suitable for resale as a cost-effective alternative to new goods. The term "green market" highlights the environmentally friendly practice of putting used or discontinued products back into productive use. Although resale of these goods can compete with manufacturers, it also benefits them by allowing original users to trade in old products for value toward new purchases. Parts from green market goods can also be essential for maintaining products needing discontinued components. Often confused with the "grey market," which involves the legal resale of products through non-standard distribution channels, the green market stands out for its ecological benefits. Recycling precious materials like glass, metals, and polymers from used electronics prevents harmful environmental impacts from improper disposal, making it an eco-friendly and cost-effective solution.

== See also ==
- Green banking
- Green politics
- Green PR
- Social marketing
- Sustainable advertising
