= Jacquelyn Ottman =

American branding consultant (born 1955)

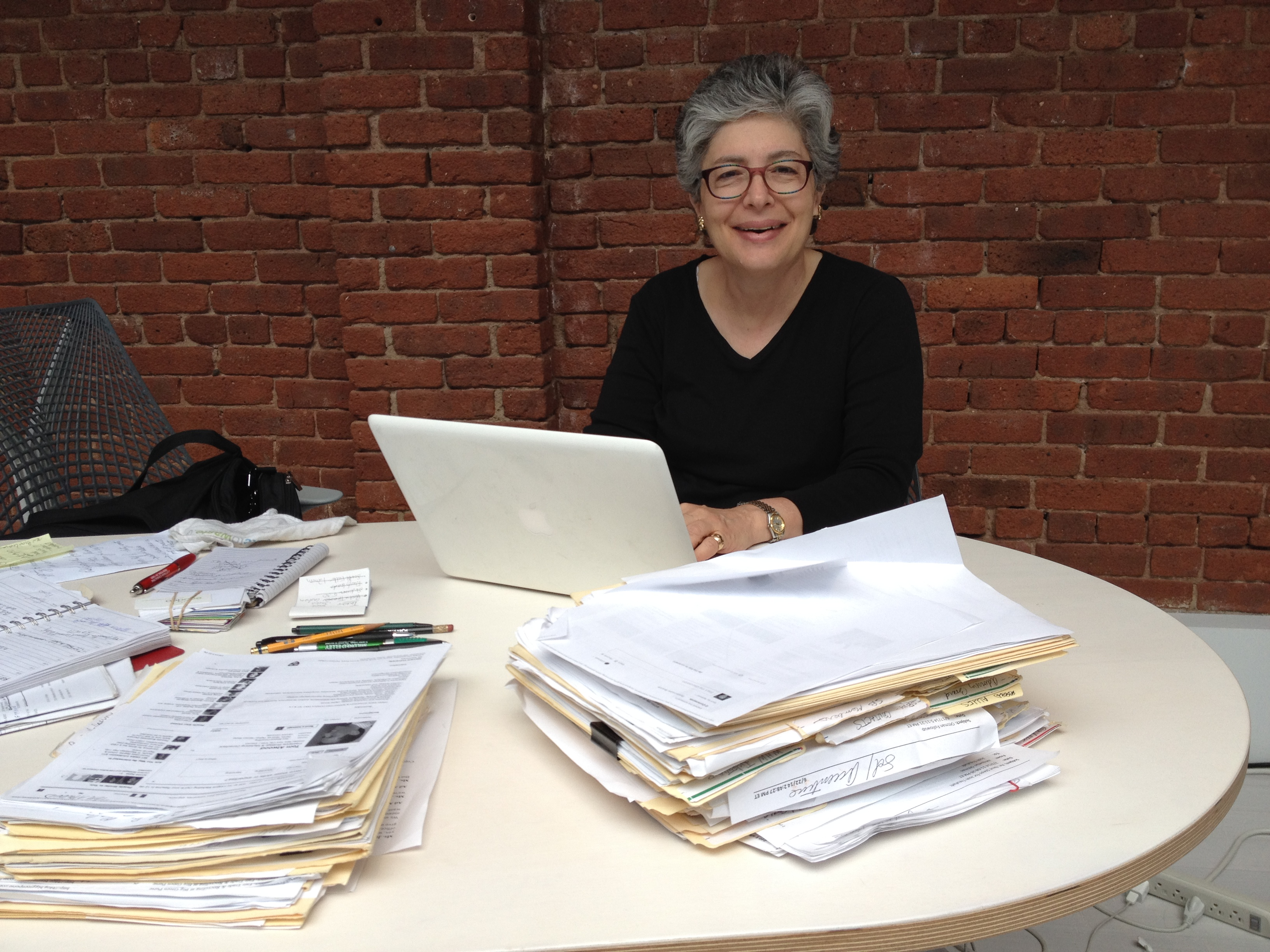
- Jacquelyn Ottman
- Born: 1955 (age 70–71); New York City
- Occupations: Founder and principal, J. Ottman Consulting Sustainability strategist Green marketing expert and author

Jacquelyn A. Ottman (born 1955) is a New York City-based consultant specializing in sustainability strategy, green marketing, and eco-innovation. She is the author or co-author of four books on green marketing, including The New Rules of Green Marketing: Strategies, Tools, and Inspiration for Sustainable Branding. She has advised Fortune 500 companies, including GE, Johnson & Johnson, and Procter & Gamble, along with the United States Environmental Protection Agency Energy Star label. She blogs at GreenMarketing.com and at WeHateToWaste.com.

== Education ==
Ottman is a graduate of Smith College, a private, independent women's liberal arts college in Northampton, Massachusetts. She has also been awarded an advanced certification from the Creative Education Foundation in facilitating the Osborn-Parnes Creative Problem Solving Process.

== Career ==
Ottman worked for over twelve years in New York advertising agencies before setting up her own company, J. Ottman Consulting, in 1989. Ottman was the founding co-chair of the Sustainable Brands Conference in 2007 and continued to co-chair in 2008 and 2009, giving the keynote address on sustainable branding ideas. The former co-chair of the NYC chapter of O2, the global network of green designers and marketers, for seven years she chaired the jury of the American Marketing Association's Special Edison Awards for Environmental Achievement. She is the founding co-chair of the Sustainable Business Committee of the Columbia Business School Alumni Club of New York and sits on the advisory boards of the Centre for Sustainable Design (UK), and the Center for Small Business and the Environment. In 2012, she founded WeHateToWaste.com, a global platform for sharing stories about reducing waste in consumer lifestyles. She is the founding chair of the Residential Recycling and Reuse Committee of the Manhattan Solid Waste Advisory Board.

== Awards ==
In 2005, Ottman was named one of "25 Environmental Champions of the Year" by Interiors and Sources magazine, along with Robert F. Kennedy Jr and George F. Pataki, governor of New York. In 2004, Ottman was awarded a $50,000 Innovation Grant by US EPA to create the Design:Green Educational Initiative for Eco-Design. Design:Green now continues as a course in the online Certificate in Sustainable Design program of the Minneapolis College of Art and Design. In 2002, J. Ottman Consulting Inc. won an award for "Advancing an Understanding of Green Marketing and Eco-Innovation as Sources of Competitive Advantage in Modern Business" from the American Society for Competitiveness. In 2010, Ottman's book The New Rules of Green Marketing was named a Top 40 Sustainability Book of 2010 by the Cambridge University (UK) Program for Sustainability Leadership.

== Publications ==
- Ottman, Jacquelyn (2018). If Trash Could Talk: Poems, Stories and Musings. Createspace. ISBN 9781987620559.
- Ottman, Jacquelyn (30 June 2011). "Moving Sustainability Forward: A Road Map for Consumer Marketers". Sustainable Brands.
- Ottman, Jacquelyn; Mallen, David (2013). "How to Make Credible Green Marketing Claims: What Marketers Need to Know about the Updated FTC Green Guides". AdAge.
- Ottman, Jacquelyn (2011). The New Rules of Green Marketing: Strategies, Tools and Inspiration for Sustainable Branding. Berrett-Koehler Publishers. ISBN 9781605098685.
- Ottman, Jacquelyn; Stafford, Edwin R.; Hartman, Cathy (2006). "Avoiding Green Marketing Myopia" (PDF). Environment. 48 (5).
