= Theodore Levitt =

German-born American economist

- Born: March 1, 1925; Vollmerz, Main-Kinzig-Kreis, Germany
- Died: June 28, 2006 (aged 81); Belmont, Massachusetts, U.S.
- Education: Antioch College; Ohio State University
- Occupation: Economist
- Employer: Harvard Business School

Theodore Levitt (March 1, 1925 – June 28, 2006) was a German-born American economist and a professor at the Harvard Business School. He was editor of the Harvard Business Review, noted for increasing the Review's circulation and popularizing the term globalization. In 1983, he proposed a definition for corporate purpose: "Rather than merely making money, it is to create and keep a customer".

== Early life ==
Levitt was born in 1925 in Schlüchtern-Vollmerz to a Jewish family. A decade later his family moved to Dayton, Ohio. He served in World War II, received his high school diploma through correspondence school and then earned a bachelor's degree at Antioch College, a college founded by the Christian Connection, and a PhD in economics at the Ohio State University. His first teaching job was at the University of North Dakota.

In 1959 he joined the faculty of the Harvard Business School. Later that year, he became well known after publishing Marketing Myopia in Harvard Business Review where he asks "What business are you in?", a phrase that demands one account for the significance of the job one does.

== Role in developing the term "globalization" ==
Though widely credited with coining the term globalization in an article entitled "Globalization of Markets", which appeared in the May–June 1983 issue of Harvard Business Review, he was not the originator of the term. As a New York Times article notes, the term 'globalization' was in use well before this publication (at least as early as 1944) and had been used by economists as early as 1981. Nonetheless, Levitt can be credited with popularizing the term and bringing it to a mainstream business audience.

== Further work ==
He was the author of The Marketing Imagination, and his works have been translated into eleven languages. He was also the author of numerous articles on economic, political, management, and marketing subjects. His Marketing Intangible Products and Product Intangibles article (1981, in the Harvard Business Review) argued that the distinction made between goods and services is not sustainable.

Between 1985 and 1989, he headed the Harvard Business Review as editor.

== Honors and accolades ==
He was a four-time winner of the McKinsey Awards competitions for best annual article in the Harvard Business Review; winner of Academy of Management Award for the outstanding business books of 1962 for Innovation in Marketing; winner of John Hancock Award for Excellence in Business Journalism in 1969; recipient of the Charles Coolidge Parlin Award as "Marketing Man of the Year" 1970; recipient of the George Gallup Award for Marketing Excellence, 1976; recipient of the 1978 Paul D. Converse Award of the American Marketing Association for major contributions to marketing; and recipient of the 1989 William M. McFeely Award of the International Management Council for major contributions to management.

== Death ==
Levitt died at the age of 81 in his home on June 28, 2006, after a long illness. His memorial was held at his favorite tennis club. He was survived by his wife of 58 years and by four children.

== Books and articles ==
Articles:

- Marketing Myopia, Harvard Business Review, 1960.
- Creativity Is Not Enough, Harvard Business Review, 1963.
- Marketing Intangible Products and Product Intangibles, Harvard Business Review, May–June 1981, p. 94-102.
- After The Sale Is Over, Harvard Business Review, September–October 1983, p. 87-93.
- The Globalization of Markets, Harvard Business Review, May–June 1983.

Books:

- The Third Sector: New Tactics for a Responsive Society. 1973
- Marketing for business growth, 1974, New York : McGraw-Hill, First ed. published in 1969 under the title: The marketing mode.
- The marketing imagination, 1983, New York : The Free Press
- The marketing imagination, 1986, New York : Free Press (New, expanded ed.)
- Thinking about management, 1991, New York : Free Press
- Levitt on marketing, 1991, Boston, Mass. : Harvard Business School Press

== See also ==
- Globalization
- Harvard Business Review

== Archives and records ==
- Theodore Levitt papers at Baker Library Special Collections, Harvard Business School.

== Additional ==
- Theodore Levitt Dead at 81 JUNE 29, 2006 Businessweek online
- Theodore Levitt, 81, Who Coined the Term 'Globalization', Is Dead New York Times July 6, 2006
- Complete
