= Marketing myopia =

Caused by product concept in marketing

Marketing myopia is the tendency of businesses to define their market so narrowly as to miss opportunities for growth. It is suggested that businesses will do better in the long-term if they concentrate on improving the utility of a product or good, rather than just trying to sell their products.

== Origin ==
In 1960 Theodore Levitt postulated that a myopic culture would lead a business to fall due to the short-sighted mindset and the illusion that a firm is in a so-called "growth industry." Such beliefs lead to complacency and losing sight of what customers want. It is said that myopic managers focus more on the original product and refuse to adapt to the needs and wants of the consumer.

To continue growing, companies must understand and act on their customers’ needs and desires instead of banking on the presumptive longevity of their products. In many cases growth is threatened, slowed or stopped not because the market is saturated but because of a failure of management.

Levitt's paper was influential. Some commentators have suggested that the publication of Levitt's book marked the beginning of the modern marketing movement. Its theme is that the vision of most organizations is too constricted by a narrow understanding of what business they are in. The book exhorted CEOs to re-examine their corporate vision and redefine their markets in terms of wider perspectives. It was successful because it was, as with all of Levitt's work, essentially practical and pragmatic. Organizations found that they had been missing opportunities which were plain to see once they adopted a wider view. For example, several oil companies (which represented one of his main examples in the paper) redefined their business as energy rather than just petroleum. By contrast, when the Royal Dutch Shell embarked on an investment program in nuclear power, it failed to demonstrate a more circumspect regard for their industry.

One reason that shortsightedness is so common is that people feel they cannot accurately predict the future. While this is a legitimate concern, prioritizing customer needs instead of focusing on the product or service. Customer needs are far more static over time. Oil company customers will always need energy, while they may not always need petroleum to fill that need.

There is no such thing as a growth industry, according to Levitt. There are only companies organized and operated to create and capitalize on growth opportunities. Corporate self-deception revolves around four conditions:

1. The belief that growth is assured by an expanding and more affluent population.
2. The belief that there is no competitive substitute for the industry’s major product.
3. Too much faith in mass production and in the advantages of rapidly declining unit costs as output rises.
4. Preoccupation with a product that lends itself to carefully controlled scientific experimentation, improvement, and manufacturing cost reduction.

== Practical exercise ==
When industries change, companies can take advantage of a greater scope of opportunities. Levitt's work teaches managers to look beyond their current business activities and think "outside the box". George Steiner (1979) is one of many in a long line of admirers who cite Levitt's famous example on transportation. If a buggy whip manufacturer in 1910 defined its business as the "transportation starter business," they might have been able to make the creative leap necessary to move into the automobile business when technological change demanded it.

People who focus on marketing strategy, various predictive techniques, and the customer's lifetime value can rise above myopia to a certain extent. This can entail the use of long-term profit objectives (sometimes at the risk of sacrificing short term objectives).

== New marketing myopia ==
The “new marketing myopia” occurs when marketers fail to see the broader societal context of business decision making, sometimes with disastrous results for their organization and society. It stems from three related phenomena: (1) a single-minded focus on the customer to the exclusion of other stakeholders, (2) an overly narrow definition of the customer and his or her needs, and (3) a failure to recognize the changed societal context of business that necessitates addressing multiple stakeholders. In the “new marketing myopia.” customers remain a central consideration, as in the traditional “marketing myopia.” However, academics that developed the idea of the “new marketing myopia” state that it is essential to recognize that other stakeholders also require marketing attention. For business-to-consumer companies, these other stakeholders (e.g., employees) are sometimes (but not always) customers too.

== Examples ==
There are multiple examples of industries that have experienced little or severe downfall due to marketing myopia. An example of an industry that suffered from marketing myopia is the video rental industry, which was dominated by Blockbuster LLC, an American company, in the early 2000s. Blockbuster failed to adapt to the emergence and popularity of online streaming services, such as Netflix and filed for bankruptcy in 2009.

== Similar terms ==
Kotler and Singh (1981) coined the term marketing hyperopia, by which they mean a better vision of distant issues than of near ones. Baughman (1974) uses the term marketing macropia meaning an overly broad view of your industry.
