= Psychographic segmentation =

Form of market segmentation based on psychological characteristics

Psychographic segmentation has been used in marketing research as a form of market segmentation which divides consumers into sub-groups based on shared psychological characteristics, including subconscious or conscious beliefs, motivations, and priorities to explain, and predict consumer behavior. Developed in the 1970s, it applies behavioral and social sciences to explore to understand consumers' decision-making processes, consumer attitudes, values, personalities, lifestyles, and communication preferences. It complements demographic and socioeconomic segmentation, and enables marketers to target audiences with messaging to market brands, products or services. Some consider lifestyle segmentation to be interchangeable with psychographic segmentation, marketing experts argue that lifestyle relates specifically to overt behaviors while psychographics relate to consumers' cognitive style, which is based on their "patterns of thinking, feeling and perceiving".

== History ==
In 1964, Harvard alumnus and social scientist Daniel Yankelovich wrote that traditional demographic traits—sex, age and education level—lacked the insights marketers needed to inform their strategies. He suggested to use of non-demographic segmentation to help companies better predict consumer behavior, to improve product development, distribution, pricing and advertising. Around the same time, market researcher Emanuel Demby began using the term 'psychographics,' to reference variations in attitudes, values and behaviors within a specific demographic segment.

Within a decade, Arnold Mitchell and others at the Stanford Research Institute developed the Values Attitudes and Lifestyles (VALS) psychographic methodology. Despite critics—including Daniel Yankelovich— it was embraced by leading marketers, prompting Advertising Age to call VALS "one of the ten top market research breakthroughs of the 1980s."

== Advantages and disadvantages ==
Advances in computing power, and the era of big data has fueled the use of all types of segmentation. By applying analytics to break down the marketplace of consumers into smaller groups, marketers and advertisers can profile and target key audiences more effectively. Each type of segmentation offers advantages and disadvantages.

Segmentation type	Advantages	Disadvantages
Demographic and socioeconomic segmentation groups people by gender, age, ethnicity, income, education, geography and other physical or situational characteristics.	Easy to identify and target consumer groups, such as millennials, Hispanics, or women 25 to 35 years old.; Demographic and socioeconomic data is readily available through many third parties.	Broad classifications assume everyone in the segment thinks alike.; A one-size-fits-all approach to consumers based on demographics or socioeconomics offers limited effectiveness.
Behavioral segmentation groups consumers by their behaviors.	Tracking behaviors has become much easier in the era of big data and digital engagement along individual consumers' clicks along the path to purchase.; Targeting is driven based on proven consumer habits and practices.	Not all consumer behaviors have the same motivations behind them.; Messaging based on behaviors will not be equally persuasive for individual consumers who behave similarly but for different reasons.
Attitudinal segmentation groups consumers by shared attitudes and emotions about a particular subject, product or service.	Connects with consumers' articulated beliefs and needs about a specific subject.	Difficult to target consumers within a population unless they participate in an attitudinal survey.^{1}
Psychographic segmentation groups consumers by shared values, beliefs, emotions, personalities, interests and lifestyles.	Understanding consumers' unarticulated needs and motivations empowers marketers to develop more compelling messaging.	Difficult to target consumers within a population unless individuals participate in a psychographic survey.^{1}

1. Attitudinal and psychographic segments may be projected across a population through predictive modeling based on many variables, though the accuracy may be greatly reduced.

Ultimately, the argument for any type of segmentation is to identify high-yield target markets that are likely to meet growth potential, profitability, or other specific goals.

== Methods of model development ==
The traditional way to develop a psychographic segmentation model has been through a market research study surveying a statistically representative sample of a target audience. That target audience could be representative of the general population, a specific demographic or socioeconomic group, a population of consumers who utilize a certain product or service category or any group of people relevant to one's research or business objectives.

The first step is the development of a robust questionnaire consisting of a series of attitudinal statements, often using a Likert scale (e.g., Strongly Agree = 1, Agree = 2, Neither Agree Nor Disagree = 3, Disagree = 4, Strongly Disagree = 5), to assess consumer beliefs about a given subject. Consideration should be given to dimensions that will differentiate consumers in the market, such as attitudes and beliefs about a certain topic or behaviors in a specific situation.

A factor analysis using statistical clustering procedures is conducted to examine response patterns to the survey questions. Natural clusters or segments emerge from groups of respondents who answer the survey questions in a similar manner. A useful illustration is a scatter plot with all of the respondents' answers that shows clusters of respondents who answered the survey questions similarly. Taking all the survey questions into account, consistent groups — or psychographic segments — are identified.

Statistical analysis of the respondents' answers can also identify an algorithm that uses a subset of the survey questions to classify consumers according to the psychographic segments. This could involve five, ten, fifteen or other limited set of questions that effectively categorize consumers by segment.

In addition to using surveys to gather psychographic data, experts suggest that social media monitoring and analytics can also help marketers identify trends in consumer interests, attitudes, sentiments, and psychographic clusters.

After using quantitative marketing research to identify psychographic segments, many marketers and researchers will follow up with qualitative research (e.g., focus groups and one-on-one interviews) with members of each psychographic segment. This allows for additional insights and translation of the quantitative data from the perspective of each segment. This is a useful step for helping to prevent bias in the researcher's interpretation of the data, as researchers may view data through the lens of their own attitudes and motivations.

The optimal psychographic segmentation model should meet several criteria:

1. It provides the most differentiation when comparing segments.
2. It produces segments that are internally consistent.
3. It provides actionable insights.
4. It creates solutions that are stable and reproducible.
5. It balances predictability with practicality.

A psychographic segmentation model should be able to accurately predict the segment to which a consumer belongs with an acceptable level of confidence. Often there are trade-offs involved. For instance, a model may attain a higher level of predictability with a greater number of segments, but too many segments become unwieldy and infeasible to juggle when operationalizing the model. This also pertains to the number of questions used in the algorithm to classify consumers by segment. More questions may be more predictive, but there are diminishing returns past a certain number of questions, and too many questions decrease completion rates among consumers.

Recent developments in psychographic segmentation have broadened the set of variables used in model development. In addition to traditional attitudinal surveys and clustering, researchers have identified enduring worldview orientations—such as liberal-conservative value systems—as influential predictors of consumer attitudes and brand affinities. Similarly, cultural geography research shows that regional psychological differences within countries can shape individual preferences, communication styles, and political behavior, which are increasingly considered in psychographic profiling. Generational value shifts also play a role, with survey data showing measurable distinctions between cohorts such as Baby Boomers, Generation X, Millennials, and Generation Z in how they perceive institutions, media, and authority. These variables can be integrated into segmentation models using supervised learning or multivariate analysis to improve behavioral predictions.

=== AI-Driven Psychographic Segmentation ===
Recent advances in artificial intelligence (AI), machine learning (ML), and natural language processing (NLP) have significantly expanded the scope of psychographic segmentation. These technologies allow for the analysis of large-scale behavioral and linguistic data to infer personality traits, values, and preferences with increasing accuracy. For example, academic studies have demonstrated that digital footprints—such as social media likes or language use—can be used to predict psychological profiles and behavioral tendencies at individual or group levels.

In the commercial sector, established systems such as Esri's Tapestry Segmentation and Claritas PRIZM incorporate behavioral and lifestyle attributes alongside geodemographics to classify consumers into detailed psychographic types at ZIP-code or neighborhood levels. More recently, companies such as Lifemind have developed AI-powered platforms that integrate worldview orientation, generational values, and regional cultural patterns to refine segmentation and predictive modeling. These approaches combine supervised learning, natural language analysis, and clustering techniques to match audiences with personalized messaging or brand positioning strategies.

Some platforms also integrate NLP models to mine publicly available text—such as survey responses, interviews, or social media posts—to build psychographic profiles without requiring direct survey participation.[7] These developments have made psychographic segmentation more scalable and operationally efficient in digital marketing, customer experience design, and political campaign targeting.

== Examples of psychographic segmentation use ==
Consumers recognize that modern marketers and advertisers collect a wealth of data about prospects and customers. As a result, consumers hold brands to a higher standard. Individual consumers expect greater relevance and personalized brand experiences in exchange for the information they share. These expectations, in turn, have increased the need for psychographic segmentation.

=== Retail industry ===
Marketers of educational/entertainment technology for the family (e.g., e-readers and video game systems), for example, can identify key audiences based on family income, ages of children in the household, or other demographic indicators. However, these factors do not identify the "why" behind purchases. Using psychographic segmentation, marketers can drill down to types of purchasers:

- 'Enablers' who focus on the entertainment value of technology tend to let their children guide tech decisions.
- 'Limiters' who regulate screen time tend to look for technology that offers educational value and family participation options.

Understanding these psychographic variations among likely consumers allows marketers to fine-tune keyword targeting to appeal to these distinct sub-groups.

Similarly, a retail drugstore chain uses a combination of segmentation to identify a super-user who is motivated by a sense of responsibility for family. Marketing strategies are therefore focused on a customer persona of a woman in her early 50s who manages medications for her children, herself and her spouse, and her aging parents.

=== Travel industry ===
Business travelers have different needs and expectations than vacationers. However, marketing to such broad categories alone fails to capture motivations and personal preferences. Within the broad segment of Leisure Travelers, for example, travel brands can use psychographic segmentation to drill down to identify individuals as 'novelty-seeking' versus 'familiarity-seeking' consumers, and then customize campaigns based on the most relevant travel style.

Knowing that a consumer is 'familiarity-seeking', for example, could lead a travel brand to market guided tour travel packages to that consumer; a 'novelty-seeking' consumer could be targeted with a build-your-own tour package.

=== Healthcare industry ===
The healthcare industry faces an ongoing mandate to engage patients more effectively to address chronic disease and engage in healthier behaviors. However, experts note that segmentation based on demographic or socioeconomic factors falls short on motivating engagement. Similarly, one-size-fits-all programs based on a shared diagnosis do not lead to high adoption rates of recommended behaviors.

Psychographic segmentation applied to healthcare consumers can help healthcare organizations, health insurance providers, healthcare-related retailers and others classify individual consumers according to whether they:

- are proactively engaged in health and wellness or reactive and disengaged,
- need directive guidance by healthcare professionals or want options and choices in their care,
- believe in holistic and alternative medicine or dismiss it, relying only on traditional medicine,
- prioritize others' health and wellness over their own,
- display various other motivations, priorities and preferences.

Segmenting healthcare consumers by these factors allows one to customize messaging (whether verbal, print or digital) to appeal to individual motivations to improve overall engagement, drive behavior changes, boost adherence to care plans or increase adoption of medical devices and apps.

Several commercial systems have institutionalized psychographic segmentation at scale. Esri's Tapestry Segmentation and Claritas' PRIZM system integrate geodemographic and behavioral variables to define psychographic personas tied to U.S. ZIP codes, supporting targeting in retail, real estate, healthcare, and media buying. More recently, Lifemind has developed an AI-powered segmentation platform that incorporates worldview orientation, generational values, and regional cultural patterns into market modeling. Its methodology has been featured in industry podcasts focused on marketing, branding, and sales strategy. These tools aim to help brands move beyond surface-level targeting by identifying motivational drivers behind consumer behaviors.

The use of psychographic segmentation and insights have been demonstrated in a clinical setting to improve outcomes, from helping patients with diabetes achieve personal health goals to reducing hospital readmissions following surgery.

== Ethical Considerations ==
While psychographic segmentation offers the potential for more personalized and relevant messaging, it also raises ethical concerns. The use of consumer psychological data—particularly when inferred through AI or behavioral tracking—can challenge privacy norms, especially when individuals are unaware of how their traits are being profiled or applied. Researchers have warned that psychographic data may be used to manipulate consumer behavior, political attitudes, or emotional responses in ways that undermine autonomy or informed choice.

Concerns have also been raised about algorithmic bias. Models trained on incomplete or skewed data may reinforce stereotypes or produce unfair targeting outcomes, particularly across demographic lines. As segmentation systems increasingly draw from large-scale digital footprints, experts have called for transparency in how psychographic insights are derived and used, as well as regulatory oversight in sensitive contexts such as healthcare, finance, and political campaigning.
