= Precision marketing =

Precision marketing is a marketing technique that suggests successful marketing is to retain, cross-sell, and upsell existing customers.

Precision marketing emphasizes relevance as part of the technique. To achieve Precision Marketing, marketers solicit personal preferences directly from recipients. They also collect and analyze behavioral and transactional data.

== Development ==
The development of precision marketing coincides with the development of market segmentation, advancements in technology and the customer's reaction to the proliferation of mass marketing.

Zabin and Brebach portray the development of market segmentation. They describe the inception of the term in the 1950s and show that with time, increasingly more information was considered relevant for marketing purposes. Market segmentation evolved from simple demographics in the 1950s to geodemographics and behavioral segmentation in the 1960s (the propensity to purchase) to psychographics data in the 1970s (personality and lifestyle), to customer loyalty and profitability in the 1990s and to economic data in current times. The conceptual evolution of market segmentation is the cornerstone of precision marketing. In precision marketing, segments could be defined as narrowly as follows: full-time MBA students, married with young children, planning their next vacation.

The evolution of segmentation was supported by advancements in technology. The shift into digital enabled an easier capture and retention of data while increasingly efficient databases facilitated the usability of that data. Although advancements in technology were crucial to the type of market segmentation used in precision marketing, they were not the driving force behind it. Instead, customer demand and expectation, alongside the fierce competition, were the driving factors.

Learmer and Simmons (Learmer & Simmons, 2007) determine that American consumers are overwhelmed by an avalanche of over 3000 marketing messages daily Marketing messages increasingly penetrate the private domain both in print (direct mail and telemarketing) and in digital (emails and mobile phone). As a result, customers are becoming less receptive to unsolicited marketing communication, specifically if it is irrelevant or impersonal. This is the context that gave rise to the practice of precision marketing.

== Application ==
The most common applications of precision marketing are in customer retention and revitalization. Here are a few examples for precision marketing tactics that have been used by several major companies, such as Best Western and Tesco. The German Healthcare Agency Wefra life executes their communication strategies based on this approach.

== See also ==
- Demographic profile
- Market segmentation
- Mass marketing
- Niche market
- Psychographic
- Target market
