= Sagacity segmentation =

Statistical method to divide a population

Sagacity segmentation is a means of segmenting a population of interest using life-cycle stage, income and occupation variables. The logic behind this segmentation systems is that as people pass through life, their aspirations and behavior patterns (including consumption of goods and services) also change.

== Background ==
Sagacity segmentation was developed by a company trading as Research Services in the early 1980s. The objective was to gain greater insights from segmentation variables such as the family, occupation, and income.

== Segmentation criteria ==
The segmentation criteria include:

- The 4 main stages of life cycle
  - Dependent: mainly under 24 living at home
  - Pre-family: under 35s who have established their own household, but without children
  - Family: couples under 65 with one or more children in the household
  - Late: adults whose children have left home or who are over 35 and childless
- Income groups (only under Family and Late groups above)
  - Better off
  - Worse off
- Occupation groups (refer to the socio-economic groups defined by NRS)
  - White (collar) – or the A, B and C1 social groups (i.e., Upper middle class, Middle class, and Lower middle class)
  - Blue (collar) – or the C2, D and E social groups (i.e., Skilled working class, Working class, and Those at lowest level of subsistence)
- Gender
  - Male
  - Female

This approach to segmentation generates 24 groups of households.

Sagacity segmentation is most often used by banks and financial institutions because life-stage is perceived to be a major factor in making major financial decisions such as purchasing a car, house or life insurance. Sagacity segmentation is widely used in media analyses and media planning.

== See also ==
- Consumer behaviour
- Market segmentation
