= Demographic profile =

Form of demographic analysis used by marketers

Age group with the largest population

A demographic profile is a form of demographic analysis in which information is gathered about a group to better understand the group's composition or behaviors for the purpose of providing more relevant services.

In business, a demographic profile is usually used to increase marketing efficiency. This is done by using gathered data to determine how to advertise products or services to specific audiences and identify gaps in marketing strategy. By focusing on a specific audience, a company can more efficiently spend advertising resources to maximize sales. This tactic is more direct than simply advertising on the basis that everyone is a potential consumer; while this may be true, it does not capitalize on the increased returns that more focused marketing can generate.

Traditional demographic profiling involves gathering information on large groups of people in order to identify common trends, such as changes in population size or composition over time. These trends can be identified by analyzing data gained through surveys, censuses, in-store purchase information, records, registries, and so on. Analysis of this information may promote change in services for a population subset, such as children, the elderly, or working-age people. Newer methods of collecting and using information for demographic profiling include target-sampling, quota-sampling, and door-to-door screening.

A comprehensive demographic profile is a powerful tool for marketing. Detailed information about potential customers provides insight into how to best sell them a product. The term "demographic profiling" is sometimes used as a euphemism for industrial espionage.

== Methods ==
Historically, a census has been the most important tool when it comes to tracking demographic data such as population, births, deaths, and relationship status. The United States census was first introduced in 1790 and has been taken every 10 years since under constitutional law. While the questions in the US Census vary each decade, its aim is to quantifiable measure characteristics about the residents within its borders, such as marital status, age, sex, race, education status, employment status, and location. Even though the US Census is the most relied-on tool for collecting this information, it still has its flaws, such as overcount and undercount, which have caused controversy in previous years.

Metadata provides a modern method of constructing demographic profiles. Certain types of digital metadata are generated by a user's online behavior—such as which websites are frequently visited, the amount of time spent on each website, the website interactions or purchase history, and which other users were interacted with—and serve as a digital footprint. Metadata collection is so pervasive that businesses record most aspects of a user's online activity. Companies such as Google and Facebook make enormous profits through generating and processing metadata, which can then be used for targeted advertising. This process impacts the user's online experience, such as curating which ads are displayed or which websites are suggested.

== Controversy ==
Metadata collection has proven to be a controversial topic, with concerns expressed over how and why detailed personal information is saved and used by businesses. To avoid future legislation limiting metadata collection, companies must act ethically and have people's privacy in mind when they target people for advertising.

An example of how this could become an issue is presented by Ewing et al. (2013), who proposed the idea of a virtual reality shopping programme. Within this programme, the shopper is greeted by a virtual attendant who knows them by name and suggests an array of suitable clothing options based on their past purchases. The shopper is delighted by the seamless nature of this shopping experience. However, when they try to pay with their credit card, the virtual attendee reveals an unreasonably detailed knowledge about the shopper's financial situation, such as their credit score, payment history, and financial responsibility. This example highlights the need for discretion in the extent to which information is gathered, and how it is applied.

== World demographic profile (2017) ==
	2017
World Population	7,405,107,650 (July 2017)
10 Most Populated Countries (In Millions)	China: 1379.3 India: 1281.93 United States: 326.6 Indonesia: 260.58 Brazil: 207.35 Pakistan: 204.92 Nigeria: 190.63 Bangladesh: 157.83 Russia: 142.26 Japan: 126.45
Age Structure	0–14 years: 25.44% (male 963,981,944/female 898,974,458) 15–24 years: 16.16% (male 611,311,930/female 572,229,547) 25–54 years: 41.12% (male 1,522,999,578/female 1,488,011,505) 55–64 years: 8.6% (male 307,262,939/female 322,668,546) 65 years and over: 8.68% (male 283,540,918/female 352,206,092)
Dependency Ratio	total dependency ratio: 52.5 youth dependency ratio: 39.9 elderly dependency ratio: 12.6 potential support ratio: 7.9
Median age	total: 30.4 years male: 29.6 years female: 31.1 years
Birth rate	4.3 births every second
Death rate	1.8 deaths every second
Maternal mortality	216 deaths/100,000 live births
Sex ratio	at birth: 1.03 male(s)/female 0–14 years: 1.07 male(s)/female 15–24 years: 1.07 male(s)/female 25–54 years: 1.02 male(s)/female 55–64 years: 0.95 male(s)/female 65 years and over: 0.81 male(s)/female total population: 1.02 male(s)/female
Life Expectancy	total population: 69 years male: 67 years female: 71.1 years
Total Fertility Rate	2.42 children born/woman
Languages	Mandarin Chinese: 12.2% Spanish: 5.8% English: 4.6% Arabic: 3.6% Hindi: 3.6% Portuguese: 2.8% Bengali: 2.6% Russian: 2.3% Japanese: 1.7%: Percentages for "first language" speakers only; the six UN languages – Arabic, Chinese (Mandarin), English, French, Russian, and Spanish which are mother tongues for approximately half of the world's population. They are also the official languages in over half the countries in the world with more than a million first-language speakers.; There are an estimated 7,000 languages spoken in the world and about 80% of the languages are spoken by >100,000 people and approximately 130 of those languages are spoken by >10 people.; There is an estimated amount of 2,300 languages spoken in Asia, 2,140 in Africa, 1,310 in the Pacific, 1,060 in the Americas, and 290 in Europe.
Religions	Christian: 31.4% Muslim: 23.2% Hindu: 15% Buddhist: 7.1% folk religions: 5.9% Jewish: 0.2% other: 0.8% unaffiliated: 16.4%

Source: CIA World Factbook

== Demographic profiles of top 3 most populated countries ==
=== United States ===
The United States	2017
Population	326,625,791
Age Structure	0–14 years: 18.73% (male 31,255,995 per female 29,919,938) 15–24 years: 13.27% (male 22,213,952 per female 21,137,826) 25–54 years: 39.45% (male 64,528,673 per female 64,334,499) 55–64 years: 12.91% (male 20,357,880 per female 21,821,976) 65 years and over: 15.63% (male 22,678,235 per female 28,376,817)
Dependency Ratios	total dependency ratio: 51.2 youth dependency ratio: 29 elderly dependency ratio: 22.1 potential support ratio: 4.5
Population Growth Rate	0.81%
Birth Rate	12.5 births per 1,000 people
Death Rate	8.2 deaths per 1,000 people
Net Migration	3.9 migrant(s) per 1,000 people
Sex Ratio	0–14 years: 1.04 male(s) per female 15–24 years: 1.05 male(s) per female 25–54 years: 1 male(s) per female 55–64 years: 0.93 male(s) per female 65 years and over: 0.79 male(s) per female total population: 0.97 male(s) per female
Infant Mortality	total: 5.8 deaths per 1,000 live births male: 6.3 deaths per 1,000 live births female: 5.3 deaths per 1,000 live births
Ethnic Groups	White: 72.4% Black: 12.6% Asian: 4.8% Amerindian and Alaska native: 0.9% Native Hawaiian and other Pacific Islander: 0.2% Other: 6.2% 'Two or more races: 2.9%
Maternal Mortality	14 deaths per 100,000 live births
Education Expenditure	4.9% of GDP
Languages	English: 79% Spanish: 13% other Indo-European: 3.7% Asian and Pacific island: 3.4% Other: 1%
Religions	Protestant: 46.5% Roman Catholic: 20.8% Jewish: 1.9% Mormon: 1.6% other Christian: 0.9% Muslim: 0.9% Jehovah's Witness: 0.8% Buddhist: 0.7% Hindu: 0.7%: other: 1.8% unaffiliated: 22.8% don't know/refused: 0.6%
Total Fertility Rate	1.87 children born per woman
Life Expectancy at Birth	total population: 80 years male: 77.7 years female: 82.2 years

Source: CIA World Factbook

=== China ===
China	2017
Population	1,384,688,986
Age Structure	0–14 years: 17.15% (male 127,484,177/female 109,113,241) 15–24 years: 12.78% (male 94,215,607 per female 82,050,623) 25–54 years: 48.51% (male 341,466,438 per female 327,661,460) 55–64 years: 10.75% (male 74,771,050 per female 73,441,177) 65 years and over: 10.81% (male 71,103,029 per female 77,995,969)
Dependency Ratio	total dependency ratio: 37.7% youth dependency ratio: 24.3% elderly dependency ratio: 13.3% potential support ratio: 7.5%
Population Growth	0.41%
Death Rate	7.8 deaths per 1,000 people
Birth Rate	12.3 births per 1,000 people
Sex Ratio	at birth: 1.15 male(s) per female 0–14 years: 1.17 male(s) per female 15–24 years: 1.14 male(s) per female 25–54 years: 1.04 male(s) per female 55–64 years: 1.02 male(s) per female 65 years and over: 0.92 male(s) per female total population: 1.06 male(s) per female
Maternal Mortality	27 deaths per 100,000 live births
Infant Mortality	total: 12 deaths per 1,000 live births male: 12.3 deaths per 1,000 live births female: 11.7 deaths per 1,000 live births
Life Expectancy	Average: 75.7 years male: 73.6 years female: 78 years
Total Fertility Rate	1.6 children born per woman
Ethnic Groups	Han Chinese: 91.6% Zhuang: 1.3%, other: 7.1% (Hui, Manchu, Uighur, Miao, Yi, Tujia, Tibetan, Mongol, etc.)
Religions	Buddhist: 18.2% Christian: 5.1% Muslim: 1.8% folk religion: 21.9% Hindu: < 0.1% Jewish: < 0.1% other: 0.7% (Daoist or Taoist) unaffiliated: 52.2%
Languages	Standard Chinese or Mandarin; Yue (Cantonese); Wu (Shanghainese); Minbei (Fuzhou); Minnan (Hokkien-Taiwanese); Xiang; Gan
Literacy	total population: 96.4% male: 98.2% female: 94.5%

Source: CIA World Factbook

=== India ===
India	2017
Population	1,281,935,911
Age Structure	0–14 years: 27.34% (male 186,087,665 per female 164,398,204) 15–24 years: 17.9% (male 121,879,786 per female 107,583,437) 25–54 years: 41.08% (male 271,744,709/female 254,834,569) 55–64 years: 7.45% (male 47,846,122 per female 47,632,532) 65 years and over: 6.24% (male 37,837,801 per female 42,091,086)
Dependency Ratio	total dependency ratio: 52.2% youth dependency ratio: 43.6% elderly dependency ratio: 8.6% potential support ratio: 11.7%
Population Growth	1.17%
Birth Rate	19 births per 1,000 people
Death Rate	7.3 deaths per 1,000 people
Sex Ratio	at birth: 1.12 male(s) per female 0–14 years: 1.13 male(s) per female 15–24 years: 1.13 male(s)/female 25–54 years: 1.06 male(s)/female 55–64 years: 1.01 male(s)/female 65 years and over: 0.9 male(s)/female total population: 1.08 male(s)/female
Infant Mortality	total: 39.1 deaths per 1,000 live births male: 38 deaths per 1,000 live births female: 40.4 deaths per 1,000 live births
Life Expectancy	total population: 68.8 years male: 67.6 years female: 70.1 years
Total Fertility Rate	2.43 children born per woman
Maternal Mortality	174 deaths per 100,000 live births
Ethnic Groups	Indo-Aryan: 72% Dravidian: 25% Other: 3%
Religions	Hindu: 79.8% Muslim: 14.2% Christian: 2.3% Sikh: 1.7% other and unspecified: 2%
Languages	Hindi: 41% Bengali: 8.1% Telugu: 7.2% Marathi: 7% Tamil: 5.9% Urdu: 5% Gujarati: 4.5% Kannada: 3.7% Malayalam: 3.2% Oriya: 3.2% Punjabi: 2.8% Assamese: 1.3% Maithili: 1.2% other: 5.9%
Literacy	total population: 71.2% male: 81.3% female: 60.6%

Source: CIA World Factbook

== See also ==
- Demography
- Geodemography
- Market segmentation
- Mass marketing
- Niche market
- Population profiling
- Precision marketing
- Psychographic
- Target market
