= Jeff Zabin =

American business author and executive (born 1965)

- Born: 1965 (age 60–61)
- Education: University of Wisconsin-Madison
- Occupations: Business author; executive; marketing consultant

Jeff Zabin (born 1965) is an American business author and executive who specializes in digital business transformation and technology marketing. He is best known for popularizing the term precision marketing, which he describes as a process for capturing and managing customer data, analyzing the data to derive actionable insights, and using those insights to drive more profitable customer interactions. In 2009, he founded Gleanster, a now-defunct IT market research firm. In 2013, he founded Starfleet Media, which focuses on content marketing for technology solution providers in various industry sectors, including hospitality, retail, and healthcare. He also serves as research director at Starfleet Research, the IT market research arm of Starfleet Media, and as managing editor of the industry publications Hotel Technology News and Restaurant Technology News.

Zabin co-authored two business books. The Seven Steps to Nirvana, with Mohanbir Sawhney, and with a foreword by Don Tapscott, was published by McGraw-Hill in 2001. Precision Marketing, with a foreword by Philip Kotler, was published by Wiley in 2004. Both books were translated into multiple languages. Zabin has also published hundreds of research reports and articles, on topics ranging from business intelligence and text analytics to IoT security and robotics.

Zabin previously directed the thought leadership practice at Fair Isaac Corporation (FICO) and served as Vice President and Research Fellow at Aberdeen Group. He served on the advisory boards of the Kellogg Foundation's New Options Initiative (For Youth) and the Taproot Foundation. He is a graduate of the University of Wisconsin - Madison. He began his career at Houghton Mifflin and later served as a Peace Corps volunteer in Bolivia.
