= Psychographics =

Qualitative methodology used to describe traits of humans on psychological attributes

Psychographics is defined as "market research or statistics classifying population groups according to psychological variables." The term psychographics is derived from the words "psychological" and "demographics." Two common approaches to psychographics include analysis of consumers' activities, interests, and opinions (AIO variables), and values and lifestyles (VALS).

Psychographics have been applied to the study of personality, values, opinions, attitudes, interests, and lifestyles. Psychographic segmentation is a technique for grouping populations into sub-groups according to similar psychological variables.

Psychographic studies of individuals or communities can be valuable in the fields of marketing, demographics, opinion research, prediction, and social research in general. Psychographic attributes can be contrasted with demographic variables (such as age and gender), behavioral variables (such as purchase data or usage rate), and organizational descriptors (sometimes called firmographic variables), such as industry, number of employees, and functional area.

Psychographic methods gained prominence in the 2016 US presidential election and the opposing campaigns of Hillary Clinton and Donald Trump, with the latter using them extensively in microtargeting advertisements to narrow constituencies.

== Uses ==
Psychographics is utilised in the field of marketing and advertising to understand the preferences of consumers and to predict behavior/patterns. Private research companies conduct psychographic research using proprietary techniques. For example, VALS is a proprietary framework created by Strategic Business Insights that separates US adults into eight distinct types by evaluating their motivations and resources to understand anticipated consumer behavior. Psychographics is often used for market segmentation and improved target marketing.

Psychographic segmentation is also applied to other fields and across cultures in order to understand motivations and behavior including in healthcare, politics, tourism and lifestyle choices.

== Psychographic profiling ==
Psychographics are applied to the study of cognitive attributes such as attitudes, interests, opinions, and belief, as well as the study of overt behavior (e.g., activities). A "psychographic profile" consists of a relatively complete profile of a person or group's psychographic make-up. These profiles are used in market segmentation as well as in advertising. Some categories of psychographic factors used in market segmentation include:

- activity, interest, opinion (AIOs)
- attitudes
- values
- behavior
- expressions
- gesture

== Comparison to demographics ==
Psychographics is often confused with demographics, in which historical generations may be defined both by demographics, such as the years in which a particular generation is born or even the fertility rates of that generation's parents, but also by psychographic variables like attitudes, personality formation, and cultural touchstones. For example, the traditional approaches to defining the Baby Boom Generation, Generation X, or Millennials rely on both demographic variables (classifying individuals based on birth years) and psychographic variables (such as beliefs, attitudes, values and behaviors).

Infusionsoft published an article arguing that customer psychographic segmentation is more useful than demographic information.

== See also ==
- Attitudinal targeting
- Black propaganda
- Consumer analytics
- Consumer intelligence
- Demographic targeting
- Geo-targeting
- Geodemographic segmentation
- Market analysis
- Market segmentation
- Microsegment
- Political warfare
- Project MKUltra
- Psychometrics
- Psychological warfare
- Positioning (marketing)
- Segmenting and positioning
- Serviceable available market
- Subliminal advertising
- Targeted advertising
- Total addressable market
- Values Modes
