= VALS =

Research methodology for market segmentation

VALS (Values and Lifestyle Survey) is a proprietary research methodology used for psychographic market segmentation. Market segmentation is designed to guide companies in tailoring their products and services in order to appeal to the people most likely to purchase them.

== History and description ==
VALS was developed in 1978 by social scientist and consumer futurist Arnold Mitchell and his colleagues at SRI International. It was immediately embraced by advertising agencies and is currently offered as a product of SRI's consulting services division. VALS draws heavily on the work of Harvard sociologist David Riesman and psychologist Abraham Maslow.

Mitchell used statistics to identify attitudinal and demographic questions that helped categorize adult American consumers into one of nine lifestyle types: survivors (4%), sustainers (7%), belongers (35%), emulators (9%), achievers (22%), I-am-me (5%), experiential (7%), societally conscious (9%), and integrated (2%). The questions were weighted using data developed from a sample of 1,635 Americans and their significant others, who responded to an SRI International survey in 1980.

The main dimensions of the VALS framework are resources (the vertical dimension) and primary motivation (the horizontal dimension). The vertical dimension segments people based on the degree to which they are innovative and have resources such as income, education, self-confidence, intelligence, leadership skills, and energy. The horizontal dimension represents primary motivations and includes three distinct types:

- Consumers driven by knowledge and principles are motivated primarily by ideals. These consumers include groups called Thinkers and Believers.
- Consumers driven by demonstrating success to their peers are motivated primarily by achievement. These consumers include groups referred to as Achievers and Strivers.
- Consumers driven by a desire for social or physical activity, variety, and risk taking are motivated primarily by self-expression. These consumers include the groups known as Experiencers and Makers.

At the top of the rectangle are the Innovators, who have such high resources that they could have any of the three primary motivations. At the bottom of the rectangle are the Survivors, who live complacently and within their means without a strong primary motivation of the types listed above. The VALS Framework gives more details about each of the groups.

== VALS ==
Researchers faced some problems with the VALS method, and in response, SRI developed the VALS2 programme in 1978; additionally, SRI significantly revised it in 1989. VALS2 places less emphasis on activities and interests and more on a psychological base to tap relatively enduring attitudes and values. The VALS2 program has two dimensions. The first dimension, Self-orientation, determines the type of goals and behaviours that individuals will pursue, and refers to patterns of attitudes and activities which help individuals reinforce, sustain, or modify their social self-image. This is a fundamental human need.

The second dimension, Resources, reflects the ability of individuals to pursue their dominant self-orientation and includes full-range of physical, psychological, demographic, and material means such as self-confidence, interpersonal skills, inventiveness, intelligence, eagerness to buy, money, position, education, etc. According to VALS 2, a consumer purchases certain products and services because the individual is a specific type of person. The purchase is believed to reflect a consumer's lifestyle, which is a function of self–orientation and resources.

In 1991, the name VALS2 was switched back to VALS, because of brand equity.

== Criticisms ==
Psychographic segmentation has been criticized by well-known public opinion analyst and social scientist Daniel Yankelovich, who says psychographics are "very weak" at predicting people's purchases, making it a "very poor" tool for corporate decision-makers.

The VALS Framework has also been criticized as too culturally specific for international use.

== Segments ==
The following types correspond to VALS segments of US adults based on two concepts for understanding consumers: primary motivation and resources.

- Innovators. These consumers are on the leading edge of change, have the highest incomes, and such high self-esteem and abundant resources that they can indulge in any or all self-orientations. They are located above the rectangle. Image is important to them as an expression of taste, independence, and character. Their consumer choices are directed toward the "finer things in life."
- Thinkers. These consumers are the high-resource group of those who are motivated by ideals. They are mature, responsible, well-educated professionals. Their leisure activities center on their homes, but they are well informed about what goes on in the world and are open to new ideas and social change. They have high incomes but are practical consumers and rational decision makers.
- Believers. These consumers are the low-resource group of those who are motivated by ideals. They are conservative and predictable consumers who favor local products and established brands. Their lives are centered on family, community, and the nation. They have modest incomes.
- Achievers. These consumers are the high-resource group of those who are motivated by achievement. They are successful work-oriented people who get their satisfaction from their jobs and families. They are politically conservative and respect authority and the status quo. They favor established products and services that show off their success to their peers.
- Strivers. These consumers are the low-resource group of those who are motivated by achievements. They have values very similar to achievers but have fewer economic, social, and psychological resources. Style is extremely important to them as they strive to emulate people they admire.
- Experiencers. These consumers are the high-resource group of those who are motivated by self-expression. They are the youngest of all the segments, with a median age of 25. They have a lot of energy, which they pour into physical exercise and social activities. They are avid consumers, spending heavily on clothing, fast-foods, music, and other youthful favorites, with particular emphasis on new products and services.
- Makers. These consumers are the low-resource group of those who are motivated by self-expression. They are practical people who value self-sufficiency. They are focused on the familiar - family, work, and physical recreation - and have little interest in the broader world. As consumers, they appreciate practical and functional products.
- Survivors. These consumers have the lowest incomes. They have too few resources to be included in any consumer self-orientation and are thus located below the rectangle. They are the oldest of all the segments, with a median age of 61. Within their limited means, they tend to be brand-loyal consumers.

== See also ==
- Advertising
- Data mining
- Demographics
- Fear, uncertainty, and doubt
- Marketing
- Psychographics
