= Arnold Mitchell (social scientist) =

American social scientist (1918–1985)

- Born: February 18, 1918; New York City, New York
- Died: July 17, 1985 (aged 67); Menlo Park, California
- Scientific career
- Institutions: SRI International

Arnold Mitchell (February 18, 1918 – July 17, 1985) was a social scientist and consumer futurist who worked for SRI International and created a noted psychographic methodology, Values, Attitudes and Lifestyles (VALS).

== Early life and education ==
Arnold Mitchell was the son of economist Wesley Clair Mitchell and educator Lucy Sprague Mitchell.

== Career ==
Mitchell coauthored a report on Voluntary Simplicity with Duane Elgin that was published by SRI in June 1976. The report was expanded and republished with a survey in CoEvolution Quarterly in 1977, which was used as the basis the 1981 book Voluntary Simplicity.

=== VALS ===
Mitchell created the Values, Attitudes and Lifestyles (VALS) psychographic methodology at SRI International in the late 1970s. VALS helps companies tailor their products and services to appeal to the people most likely to purchase them, and explains changing U.S. values and lifestyles. It was formally inaugurated as an SRI product in 1978. VALS was subsequently called "one of the ten top market research breakthroughs of the 1980s" by Advertising Age magazine.

In the VALS study, Mitchell identified three major values groups in society: the Traditionalists, the Modernists and the Cultural Creatives. The Traditionalists, as he saw them, were those who wanted to return to the 1950s, with mom in the kitchen and the white picket fence around the house. The Modernists were those who thought technology would solve all our problems. And the Cultural Creatives, consisting of two subgroups of "Greens" and "Spiritual Seekers," were people who were self-directed and interested both in developing themselves in fulfilling ways and in being of service to the larger community.

According to Mitchell, this group comprised 24 percent of the American population by late 1980, and was the fastest growing values group in America. Mitchell coined the term "Cultural Creatives", which was popularized by Paul Ray and Sherrie Anderson in their 2000 book, Cultural Creatives: How 50 Million People Are Changing The World. Mitchell's earlier work identifying Cultural Creatives is not acknowledged in this work.

== Selected publications ==
- Mitchell, Arnold; Logothetti, Thomas J.; Kantor, Robert E. (1971). An approach to measuring quality of life. SRI International.
- Mitchell, Arnold; Elgin, Duane (1981). Voluntary Simplicity.
- Mitchell, Arnold (May 1984). Nine American Lifestyles: Who We Are and Where We're Going. Warner Book. ISBN 0446389803.
