= Duane Elgin =

American writer

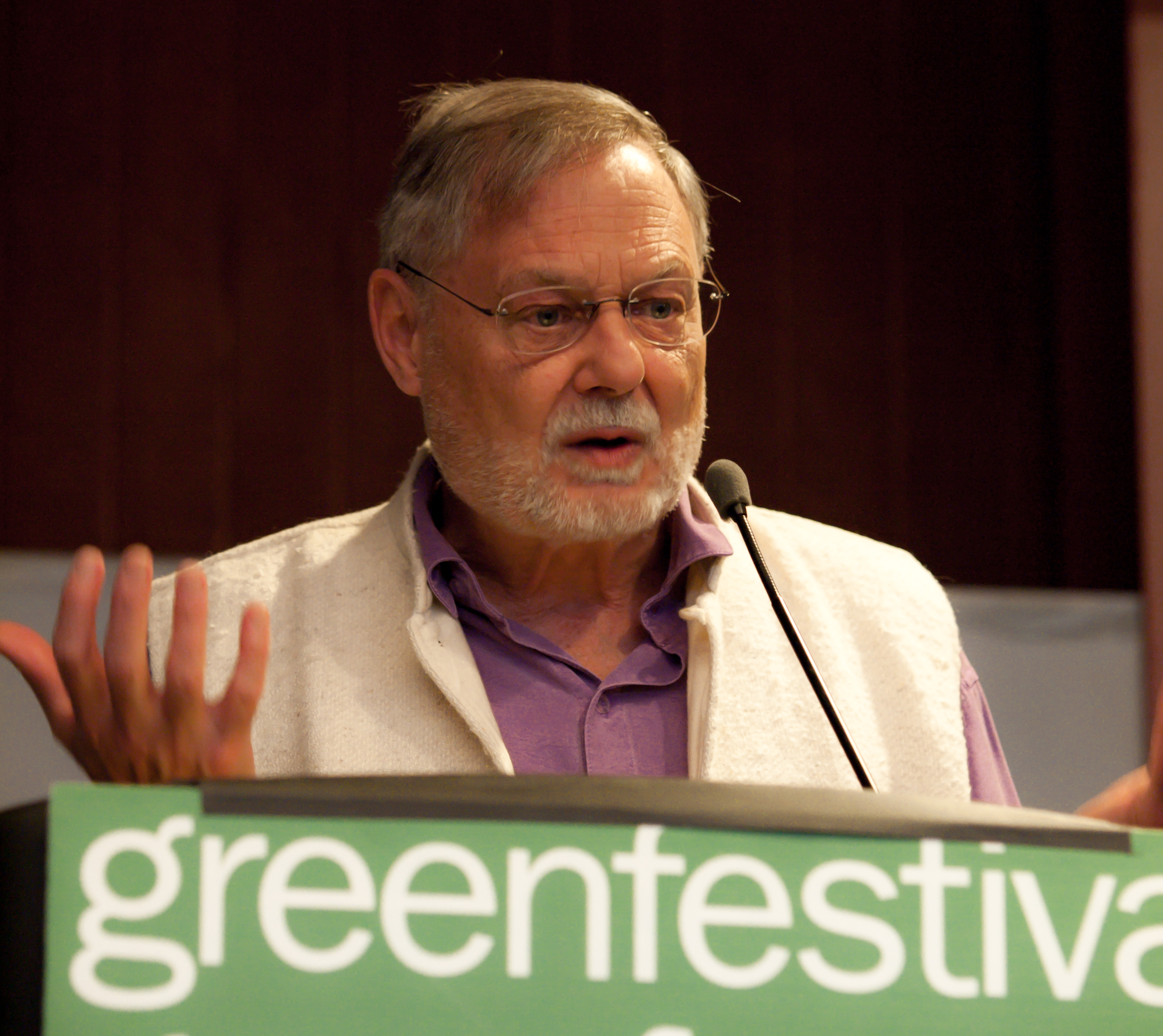
Duane Elgin in 2010.

Duane Elgin (born 1943) is an American author, speaker, educator, consultant, and media activist.

== Early life and education ==
Duane Elgin grew up near Wilder, Idaho. He attended the Sorbonne in Paris for one semester in 1963 and earned a Bachelor of Arts from the College of Idaho in 1966. He received a Master of Business Administration from the Wharton School of the University of Pennsylvania in 1968 and a Master of Arts in economic history from the University of Pennsylvania in 1969.

== Career ==
In the early 1970s, Elgin was a senior staff member on a joint Presidential-Congressional Commission on Population Growth and the American Future. The commission's task was to look ahead from 1970 to 2000 and explore challenges of urbanization and population growth.

Elgin moved to California, where he worked as a senior social scientist with the "futures group" at the Stanford Research Institute (now SRI International) and co-authored studies of the long-range future. His report on voluntary simplicity, co-authored with Arnold Mitchell, was published by SRI in June 1976. The report was expanded and republished with a survey in CoEvolution Quarterly in 1977. More than a thousand pages were received in response to the survey. These first-hand accounts formed the basis for his book Voluntary Simplicity, which appeared in 1981. Elgin left SRI International in 1977.

During the 1980s, he co-founded two non-profit non-partisan organizations concerned with media accountability and citizen empowerment. The national one was called "Choosing Our Future" and the San Francisco Bay Area organization was called "Bay Voice". Their mission was to give citizens a greater voice in their community by using the public airwaves for interactive "electronic town meetings". Elgin continues to promote citizen use of mass media for dialogue about the future. In 2012, Elgin and a small team launched Great Transition Stories, a non-profit organization dedicated to helping people understand ongoing societal transitions.

== Media activism ==
Over the past thirty years, Duane Elgin has co-founded two non-profit organizations dedicated to the promotion of media accountability. In 1981, he co-founded "Choosing Our Future" (COF), a national organization with members in 26 states. COF objected to the renewal of licenses of all the major broadcast TV stations in the San Francisco Bay Area on the grounds they were not serving the communication needs of citizens. After the FCC sided with broadcasters and renewed their licenses, Choosing Our Future then created an inclusive "community voice" organization called "Bay Voice".

In 1987, these organizations put an interactive Electronic Town Meeting (ETM) on the air in the Bay Area during prime-time, working with the local ABC television station. The "ETM" was seen by over 300,000 people and six votes were taken from a pre-selected, random sample of Bay Area citizens. Elgin has written extensively on themes of media and democracy since the 1980s.

== Awards and honors ==
In 1999, a group of roughly 30 'evolutionary leaders' met with the Dalai Lama in Dharamsala, India over a period of five days to explore "Synthesis Dialogues" and themes of the new paradigm and building a sustainable and a spiritual future for humanity. In 2001 Elgin was awarded an honorary PhD for work in "ecological and spiritual transformation" from the California Institute of Integral Studies (CIIS) in San Francisco. He is also a member of the CIIS "Council of Sages". In 2006 Elgin received the annual Goi International Peace Award in Japan in recognition of his contribution to a global "vision, consciousness, and lifestyle" that fosters a "more sustainable and spiritual culture".

Elgin has been a visiting scholar at Denison University in Ohio in May, 2004 (for a 5-day workshop on theme of "Simplicity and Envisioning a Positive Future"). He has also been a 'distinguished scholar' at Rollins College in Winter Park, Florida in 2012 where he spoke to both public and student audiences about our time of "great transition". Duane Elgin was described in April 2009 by the Ecologist Magazine as one of the ten leading visionaries with "big ideas for a better world".

== Selected publications ==
=== Long-range futures ===
- Elgin, Duane, Choosing Earth: Humanity's Journey of Initiation Through Breakdown and Collapse to Mature Planetary Community. Revised Edition, 2022.
- Co-author, Alternative Futures for Environmental Policy Planning: 1975 – 2000, prepared by SRI International, Menlo Park, California, for the Environmental Protection Agency, 1975, Contract NSF/STP 76–02573.
- Co-author, Assessment of Future National and International Problem Areas, prepared by SRI International, Menlo Park, California, for the National Science Foundation, 1977, NSF/STP76-02573.
- Elgin, Duane, Limits to the Management of Large, Complex Systems, prepared for the National Science Foundation by SRI International, Menlo Park, California, 1977, Contract NSF/STP76-02573.

=== Ways of living ===
- Elgin, Duane, Voluntary Simplicity: Toward a Way of Life That Is Outwardly Simple, Inwardly Rich, (published in three editions, 1981, 1993, 2010), Harper, January 5, 2010, ISBN 978-0-06-177926-8.
- Co-author with Arnold Mitchell, Voluntary Simplicity for the Long Range Planning Service and Business Intelligence Program at SRI International, Menlo Park, California, June 1976, Report No. 1004.
- Co-author and project director, City Size and the Quality of Life: An Analysis of the Policy Implications of Continued Population Concentration, prepared by the Stanford Research Institute for the National Science Foundation and United States Senate, Washington, D. C., 1974, NSF Contract GI.138462.
- Elgin has written a number of blogs for Huffington Post on the theme of simplicity and sustainability; including: Simplicity is Not Sacrifice!, 6/7/11, Thriving in a Post-Consumerist Society, 6/12/11, Eight Expressions of Simplicity for Healthy Living, 8/15/11, and Four Misconceptions About the Simple Life, 8/27/11.

=== The human journey ===
- Elgin, Duane, Awakening Earth: Exploring the Evolution of Human Culture and Consciousness, published by Wm. Morrow, 1993, ISBN 978-0-688-11621-7.
- Elgin, Duane, Promise Ahead: A Vision of Hope and Action for Humanity's Future, published by Wm. Morrow (now Harper), 2000, ISBN 0-688-17191-5.
- Co-author: Elgin worked with a small team of scholars, including Joseph Campbell, to co-author the major report, Changing Images of Man, prepared by the Stanford Research Institute for the Kettering Foundation, 1974, and published as a book by the same title by Pergamon Press in 1981, ISBN 978-0-08-024313-9.
- Author, Global Consciousness Change: Indicators of an Emerging Paradigm, prepared by Duane Elgin with Coleen LeDrew for the Fetzer Institute, the State of the World Forum, The Institute of Noetic Sciences, The California Institute of Integral Studies, and the Brande Foundation, 1997.

=== The Universe as a living system ===
- Elgin, Duane, The Living Universe: Where Are We? Who Are We? Where Are We Going?, published by Berrett-Koehler, 2009, ISBN 978-1-57675-969-1.
- In 1988, Elgin published the extended article, Author, "The Living Cosmos: A Theory of Continuous Creation" published in the journal ReVision, Volume 11, No. 1, Washington, D. C., Heldref Publications, Summer 1988.
- Elgin, Duane, "The Paradigm of a Living Universe", published in 2000 in the Journal of World Futures and presents a scholarly summary of his cosmology.
- Elgin has also written a series of blogs for Huffington Post on themes including science and spirituality, preparing for death, and more. For example: Consciously Recognizing Ourselves Before We Die, 5/16/11, Science and Spirit Converge in the Now, 5/29/11, Humanity's Second Spiritual Age, 6/5/11, and Can Death Become Your Ally?, 7/3/11.

=== Videos ===
- Choosing Earth: Choosing Life. Elgin is a key presence in a 63-minute documentary that explores the speed, depth and magnitude of our growing planetary crisis, and the opportunity we have to meet this crisis consciously. 2022.
- Awakening as Intimacy With a Living Universe, with Duane Elgin. Science and Nonduality. 2015.
- Pete and Duane's Window is a series of seven, half-hour programs produced in 2009 and 2010 that explores our world in transition and includes topics such as: conscious evolution, global trends, mass media and mass consciousness, and more. Peter Russell (author of The Global Brain) and Duane Elgin co-host.
- Before War: Elgin produced, directed and edited this half-hour video in 1992 for MPAC (Mid-Peninsula Public Access) TV in Palo Alto, California, interviewing six professionals working in the area of conflict resolution and offering diverse, non-violent ways of responding to the crisis in Iraq and the middle-east.
