= Attitudinal targeting =

For the purpose of better understanding attitudinal targeting, it can be discussed using the 5 Ws and one H: who, what, when, where, why, and how. David Grossman, author of the article "How To Communicate Better with The 5 Ws and an H", stated this is the essential foundation in understanding the full context of a topic and making it relevant to the audience.

== Description ==
Attitudinal targeting is a type of market segmentation that layers objective research findings, typically from surveys or focus groups, into other targeting segmentation criteria. Attitudinal research typically gather qualitative methods to better understand consumer's feelings and thoughts. Researchers gather data in forms such as quotations and anecdotes to try to directly identify how to position themselves better to the consumers they wish to target (Travis, 2017).

== Process ==
Specific goals and objectives are created when conducting attitudinal research. Attitudinal research is focused on obtaining a group of consumers' feelings, predispositions, and motivations. The ultimate goal is to take a broad target audience and narrow the market into particular subsets such as consumers or businesses that share similar interests, needs etc. The objectives can be narrowed down to segmentations such as: geographic, demographic, behavioral, psychographic, cultural, etc. (Guy, 2016). Using the identified segmentation, the results allow marketers and advertisers to build custom audience profiles based on the unique characteristics of the audience surveyed.

== People involved ==
Brand advertisers and brand marketers use the data collected from attitudinal marketing to target a richly defined audience. Bryan Gernert, CEO of Resonate said, "Advertisers and brand marketers spend a significant amount of time and money researching and developing their target audiences and identifying the best message to connect on a deeper level to drive brand and product loyalty, but when they try to apply this deep knowledge online they are forced to dilute their strategy to fit the limitations of demographic and purchase behavior targeting." However, consumers make decisions based on attitude more than they do behavior. Many decisions consumers make are made based upon their attitudes, values, and beliefs therefore, making attitudinal targeting a more successful method in identifying consumers' wants and needs (Resonate, 2010).

== Location and timing of research ==
Once researchers have identified an attitudinal segment they can then engage in conducting and analyzing focus groups, social media trends, app campaigns, and databases to find what that select group takes a liking to. In the past many marketing assumptions have been made for targeting consumers, and attitudinal research is a great way to check accuracy. An example is match.com who did a campaign in hopes to find out the true attitudes that single individuals hold in order to better market their site. It has been assumed by marketers that many singles are worried about the opinions of others and are very conscious of their image. However, after match.com selected occupation as a segmentation that they would closely research, they then narrowed it down to single individuals using dating sites. After conducting surveys, to their surprise they uncovered that single individuals actually are far less likely to be concerned with others opinions compared to those who are in a relationship (Resonate, 2010). Attitudinal research can take place anywhere as long as the researcher is specific and has an accurate way to measure results.

== Advantages ==
Attitudinal research allows marketers to place a high value on their audiences' opinions and how they feel about topics and concerns that they may have. Insights can be gathers to find out what motivates consumers by directly hearing from the consumer themselves versus a practitioner trying to predict how they may feel or react (Travis, 2017). By conducting this research researchers can also more easily uncover potential problems and feelings towards a particular idea or product.

== Sources ==
- Buttry, S. The 5 W's (and How) are even more important to business than to journalism. (2011, December 21). Retrieved April 9, 2017, from https://stevebuttry.wordpress.com/2011/04/27/the-5-w%E2%80%99s-and-how-are-even-more-important-to-business-than-to-journalism/
- Guy, D. (2016). Storylift Blog. Retrieved April 23, 2017, from http://blog.storylift.com/what-is-attitudinal-targeting
- Grossman, D. (n.d.). How To Communicate Better with The 5 Ws and an H. Retrieved April 9, 2017, from https://www.yourthoughtpartner.com/blog/bid/53902/the-5-ws-and-an-h-to-communicate-virtually-anything
- Resonate. (2010). Attitudinal Targeting Is up to Four Times More Effective Than Demographic Targeting. Retrieved April 23, 2017, from http://www.marketwired.com/press-release/attitudinal-targeting-is-up-to-four-times-more-effective-than-demographic-targeting-1167677.htm
- Travis, E. (2017, April 7). The User Research Dream Team: Attitudinal vs. Behavioural Techniques. Retrieved April 23, 2017, from https://www.prwd.co.uk/blog/user-research-dream-team-attitudinal-vs-behavioural-techniques/
- University of Nebraska-Lincoln | Web Developer Network. (n.d.). Remember the 5 W's. Retrieved April 9, 2017, from http://its.unl.edu/bestpractices/remember-5-ws
