= Values Modes =

Values Modes is a segmentation tool in the United Kingdom, based on the British Values Survey.

== Background ==
The Values Modes model was created in 1973, by Pat Dade and Les Higgins. The tool, which is owned by the company Cultural Dynamics, is used strategically in marketing and political campaigns. It divides the population by values, identifying three core groups: Settlers, Prospectors and Pioneers. It is the main subject of the book "What Makes People Tick", by Chris Rose.

== Methodology ==
=== Segmentation ===
The Values Modes tool is based on the premise of twelve discrete psychographic types, under three umbrella groups. These were developed using a combination of empirical research and the application of Abraham Maslow's Hierarchy of Needs.

=== Tracking ===
The British Values Survey asks a large sample of people a range of questions each year. It uses their answers to track how values are changing. Researchers gauge shifts in the values composition of certain groups and track changes in the overall population.

=== Questions ===
The British Values Survey measures over 100 psychological attributes of individuals, and includes Shalom Schwartz's Values scales model, which identifies ten core human values. Questions are based on a simple Likert scale. They range from everyday concerns (i.e. "How much do you agree that products don't last as long as they used to?") to questions on social issues like the sentencing of criminals.

== Groups and sub-groups ==
There are three core umbrella groups, each of which contains four sub-groups.

Umbrella group	Description	Sub-groups (and synonyms)	Proportion of UK population (as of October 2014)
Pioneer group – inner-directed	Pioneers are motivated by self-realisation. Their views are governed by values of collectivism and fairness. In their personal lives they are ambitious, but seek internal fulfilment rather than the esteem of others.	'Transitionals','Flexible Individuals', ‘Concerned Ethicals’, ‘Transcenders’	32%
Prospector group – outer-directed	Prospectors are driven by the esteem of others. They are motivated by success, status and recognition. They are usually younger and more optimistic. They are often conscious of fashion or image, and tend to be swing voters.	‘Golden Dreamers’, ‘Happy Followers’, ‘Now people’, ‘Tomorrow people’	37%
Settler group – sustenance-driven	Settlers are motivated by resources and by fear of perceived threats. They tend to be older, socially conservative and security conscious. They are often pessimistic about the future, and are driven by immediate, local issues affecting them and their family.	‘Roots’, ‘Smooth sailing’, ‘Brave New Worlders’, ‘Certainty First’	31%

== Uses of Values Modes ==
=== Organisational uses ===
A person's 'values group' can affect how they view most issues, from the environment to taxation, immigration or economic and personal aspiration. Individuals with different values are said to perceive these issues differently, and are more amenable to certain changes. Values Modes is therefore used by some organisations to design policies, behaviour change strategies and social marketing campaigns. It has been deployed in areas including [public health, recycling and road safety, and has particular usage among local authorities looking to build relations with residents. Values Modes is also said to have business uses, and has also been applied to corporate governance in the past.

A person's values can also affect the language they respond best to. Prospectors, for example, are reportedly more open than Settlers to statistics-led messaging, and there are also often clashes between service providers, who tend to be Pioneers, and service-users, who are often Settlers. The Values Modes tool is therefore also used by some communications departments, to prevent “clashes” and to "tailor initiatives and messages to fit different value groups."

=== Political uses ===
Analysts who use the Values Modes tool claim that, as class-based voting has "dealigned", it provides a more accurate model of voting behaviour than segmentation based on race or ethnicity, or social class-based approaches such as Mosaic and ACORN.

This has affected how analysts who use Values Modes view politics. In the case of the Labour Party, for example, it has been suggested that the distinction between Blue and New Labour is largely a distinction between an appeal to Settler and Prospector values. The tool has also been used in the media to analyse Barack Obama's victory in the 2012 U.S. presidential election, to explore messaging in the film An Inconvenient Truth, by Al Gore, and to inform the debate about the possibility of a UK Brexit from the EU.

This has led some to go further and link people's values to fundamental changes in the political spectrum – although the three main UK political parties each have a fairly even mix of the three values groups.

=== UKIP ===
Some figures on the political left have used the Values Modes tool to try and understand the rise of UK Independence Party (UKIP) – a political party with a predominantly Settler base (especially among those with Brave New World or Golden Dreamer values), which is built on preoccupations with issues like immigration. Nick Pecorelli argues that Labour lost many of its Settler supporters in office, and attributes the rise of UKIP, in part, to this change, writing that “Labour Settlers, once the bedrock of the party’s support, are gradually being dislodged from their tribal loyalties”. Values Modes were used as part of a Labour Party strategy on 'Beating UKIP on the Ground', which was incorporated into the Fabian Society paper, "Revolt on the Left".

== Changes to values ==
=== Within individuals ===
The Values Modes tool is based on the premise that people switch between groups as life experiences change their values. If people's needs are met and goals are fulfilled they tend to make a transition through the groups. This shift usually takes the form of a move from Settler to Prospector to Pioneer, as immediate, sustenance-driven needs are replaces with more abstract concerns.

=== Over time ===
The British Values Survey indicates that, since data collection began, the proportion of the UK population in different values groups has changed significantly. The period 1973–2005 saw a shift away from Settler values – probably because of greater affluence meaning core needs were more often being met. Since the 2008 financial crisis, the survey describes a return, by some of the less optimistic Prospectors, to Settler values, perhaps as a result of resources being scarcer.

The table below tracks changes to the UK values composition over time. The increase in Prospector values between 2011 and 2012 is "hints at a hesitant return to optimism or perhaps a normalisation of austerity."

Values group	1973	2000	2005	2008	2011	2012
Pioneers	19%	36%	38%	41%	37%	38%
Prospectors	25%	30%	38%	28%	24%	32%
Settlers	56%	35%	25%	31%	39%	30%

== Criticism and alternative approaches ==
The Common Cause Foundation set of "cultural values" is seen by some as an alternative approach to Values Modes. An RSA (Royal Society for the encouragement of Arts, Manufactures and Commerce) blog post on the subject, written in February 2013, described the Common Cause critique of Values Modes as being that "Rather than satiating that level of Maslow’s ‘Hierarchy of Needs’ – and thus prompting people move to new more globally compassionate, caring needs – Values Modes will just strengthen the values of selfish consumerism." Pat Dade, according to the blog, responded by saying that such an approach would "alienate many, perhaps even most of the UK population, who don’t enjoy the feeling of being lectured in worthy-sounding Guardian-esque language, and rarely if ever change their behaviour as a result of it."

== See also ==
- World Values Survey
- Values scales
