= Demographic targeting =

Form of behavioral advertising

Demographic targeting is a form of behavioral advertising in which advertisers target online advertisements at consumers based on demographic information.

They are able to achieve this by using existing information from sources such as browser history, previous searches as well as information provided by the users themselves to create demographic profiles of consumers.

This information can then be used by advertisers to segment their audience demographically and target advertisements at specific groups of people to maximise the likelihood of their advertisements being seen by their target market; their most profitable audience.

Demography can be defined as "The study of human populations in terms of size, density, location, age, sex, race, occupation and other statistics". Using such statistics, communicators are able to segment their target audience, as consumer needs often correlate strongly with demographic variables.

== Online retailers ==
Communicators are able to present targeted advertisements based on demography using both their own stored data as well as through the use of databases.

Online retailers often require customers to register an account to shop with them. Typically, these retailers will ask customers for demographic information regarding their location, age and gender and this information will then be used to tailor their shopping experience.

=== Ethnicity/nationality ===
While the disclosure of location is necessary on such websites for deliveries and adjusting currency, advertisers also use this information to alter the shopping experience based on ethnicity, culture and international trends. Online retailers are able to present advertisements displaying what is expected to be more popular amongst some nationalities than others. For example, Amazon.co.jp (Amazon in Japan) will advertise the sale of Japanese produced TV shows, films and books on their homepage. Consumers would not expect such advertisements to be presented on the Amazon websites of other nations.

=== Gender ===
Particularly when shopping with online retailers of clothing and cosmetics, customers will often find they are asked to disclose their gender.

Gender in particular has a strong demographic correlation with the wants and needs of consumers. This is because manufacturers (especially manufacturers of clothing and cosmetics) specifically produce products for either a male or female market and the wants and needs of either gender are very different. As a result, when targeting advertisements for products such as these, it is easy for advertisers to segment the audience based on gender.

For example, a female customer on a clothing website will be presented with advertisements for a sale on dresses, whereas a male customer on the same website will be presented with advertisements for men's jeans.

=== Age and life-cycle ===
Online retailers tend to ask customers to provide their date of birth and may rationalise the request by offering an incentive such as a birthday discount. However, this information can also be used by advertisers for demographic targeting as the wants and needs of consumers change with age (Kotler et al., 2013).

For example, advertisers might target a 40+ year old person shopping on a cosmetics websites with advertisements for anti-aging creams. In contrast, advertisers might target a teenager shopping on the same website with advertisements for anti-blemish creams.

== Types of demographic segmentation ==
=== Age ===
Advertisers will separate the market into different age group categories because consumers of similar ages will have the similar interests, wants and needs. Therefore, when advertisers divide up the market by age categories they will be able to target the group or groups that will be most interested in their product and communicate directly to them. This allows the advertisers to find the most appropriate way to communicate with each group. As different age groups respond to various methods of communication differently. Over time consumers will mature and their wants and needs will change. this means that advertisers either have to change how they communicate with their current target market. Therefore, dividing the market into age groups allows for advertisers to target the age range that will find their product the most appealing.

=== Gender ===
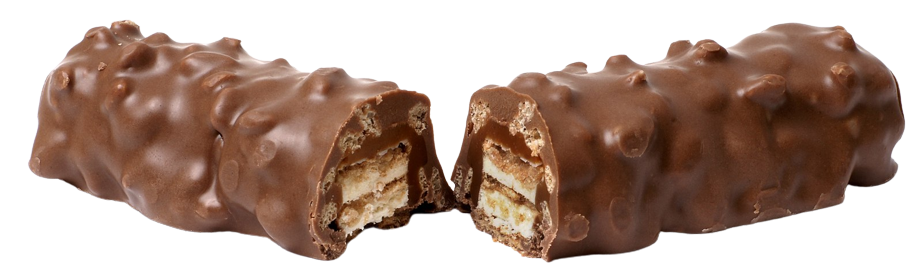
Nestlé's marketing for its chocolate brand Lion's focuses on its appeal to the “predator” within the male consumer.

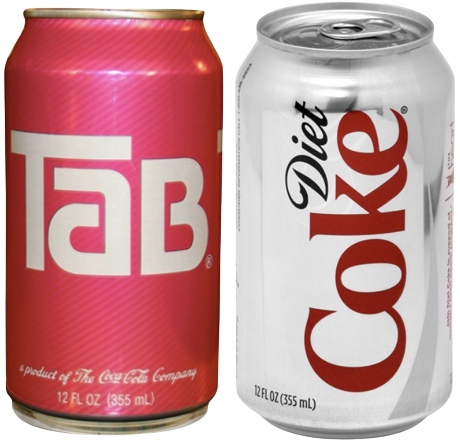
The Coca-Cola Company's former drink Tab and its successor Diet Coke both primarily target females.

Dividing the market by gender is a common way of demographically segmenting the market. It involves targeting the gender which advertisers believe their product will appeal more to. This generally is an effective way to market because men and women have some contrasting needs and wants to each other. The market for beauty products is primarily dominated by females however some males are into these products. It is important for advertisers to realise that as society's social norm changes consumers are more likely to not be defined by past gender roles. Therefore, advertisers should be cautious when using gender as a way to demographically target their target market as a way to communicate with them as they could be excluding a whole other category of possible consumers. Toy guns in the past were solely marketed towards young males, however advertisers realised there was a gap in the market and have begun marketing these kinds of products to young females as well. This has created a higher demand for these products.

=== Income ===
Dividing the market by income levels allows for advertisers to communicate with the income group that will be more interested in their products due to their income level. The products might be the same but of different qualities and therefore be more appealing to consumers with different income levels. Advertisers advertising premium products will focus on communicating with high income earners because they will be able to afford their products. However, due to each consumer having different priorities in life, not all high income earners will want to spend their money on luxurious items and some low income earners may want to spend their money on high cost products. Therefore, it is important not to rely just on the consumer's income levels when communicating with them.

=== Race ===
Dividing the market by race is important for advertisers to do. Race, religion and culture often go together hand in hand, which is why these factors do affect different consumer's buying decisions. A lot of consumers from Arab nations are Muslim, therefore an advertising campaign trying to sell a pork based product in one of these nations would be highly unsuccessful. This is why it is important to consider race as a way to demographically target a market.

=== Multivariate demographic segmentation ===
Multivariate demographic segmentation involves using at least two types of demographic variables in conjunction with each other to make the market more precise for the advertiser to target. This way of further segmentation is effective because it allows advertisers to filter out more consumers who won't match the demographics of the target market.

== In relation to other factors of targeting in the market ==
Geographic, psychographic and behavioural segmentation work in conjunction with demographic targeting in order for advertisers to find their ideal target market and communicate with them. They give marketers more details on target markets.

=== Geographic segmentation ===
Geographic segmentation divides the market into different geographic locations for example it can be separated into countries, regions, neighborhoods etc. This is due to the fact that consumers in different geographic locations may hold different preferences. Different geographic locations have different environments and climates which does affect the market for each location level. For advertisers to effectively communicate with their target audience they need to alter how they communicate with consumers in different locations.

=== Psychographic segmentation ===
Psychographic segmentation uses a consumers psychological attributes to divide the market based on the consumer's social class, personality characteristics and lifestyle. This is important because two different individuals could have a very similar set of demographics, but one will buy the product while the other won't. This is due to being different psychographically. Past experiences can cause consumers to react more positivity or more negatively to communications from an advertiser. This is why it is important for advertisers to use multiple types of segmentation in order to communicate with the right niche.

=== Behavioural segmentation ===
Behavioural segmentation divides consumers into different groups depending on their personal knowledge on a product, their attitude towards it, and their response to the product. The sections that behavioural segmentation focuses on are purchase occasions, benefits sought, user status, usage rate, loyalty status, buyer readiness stage, attitude towards the product and online behaviour. This type of segmentation is used to target consumers who are more inclined to hear and accept the communications from the advertiser and be interested in the product being offered. Behavioral segmentation is important because it examines how the consumer's past buying experiences will affect their future purchases. This means that advertisers should consider their past feedback and responses from consumers when planning any new means of communication.
