= Segmenting-targeting-positioning =

Framework that implements market segmentation

In marketing, segmenting, targeting and positioning (STP) is a framework that implements market segmentation. Market segmentation is a process, in which groups of buyers within a market are divided and profiled according to a range of variables, which determine the market characteristics and tendencies. The S-T-P framework implements market segmentation in three steps:

- Segmenting means identifying and classifying consumers into categories called segments.
- Targeting identifies the most attractive segments, usually the ones most profitable for the business.
- Positioning proposes distinctive competitive advantages for each segment.

== Segmenting ==
Whereas market segmentation is the act of dividing the market into distinct and meaningful groups of buyers who might merit separate products or marketing mixes, segmentation, in the S-T-P framework, means classifying consumers into categories. Therefore, segmentation has two meanings: it denotes both the overall process (market segmentation) and the first step of the S-T-P framework, the identification of consumer segments. This section refers to the first step of the S-T-P model.

Segmenting can be referred to as a process of segregating the market on the basis of different variables. However, segmenting a market has widely been debated over the years as researchers have argued over what variables to consider when dividing the market. Approaches through social, economic and individual factors, such as brand loyalty, have been considered along with the more widely recognized geographic, psychographics, demographic and behavioral variables proposed by Philip Kotler. Since a single product offered by a firm cannot satisfy the needs of all of the consumers, segmenting a market therefore, is a process of organising the market into groups that a business can gain a competitive advantage in and satisfy its needs. They must, however, avoid over-fragmenting the market as the diversity can make it difficult to profitably serve the smaller markets. The characteristics marketers are looking for are measurability, accessibility, sustainability and actionability.

- Measurability – The understanding of size, purchasing characteristics and value needs of a particular segment
- Accessibility – The ability to communicate with the segment in an effective manner
- Sustainability – The segment is profitable enough to differentiate itself from other segments in the market and maintains the value the business offers.
- Actionability – The capability of an organization to create a competitive advantage with its offering in the specific segment of the market

There are two approaches to segmenting a market – a discovery approach or an analytic approach. Each approach is appropriate to the type of business and market they are approaching.

An analytic approach is a much more research and data based approach, where two sets of information are derived and used to segment the market. The two approaches give the business an idea for the future profitability of a segment, and the tendencies and behaviours it portrays. The first approach gives them an idea on the future growth of the segment, and whether its investment outcome is worthwhile. This, therefore, will usually be done in advance. The second approach is more based around the observation of the buying behaviours of the segment and is more based around primary research.

The discovery approach, also called feral segmentation, is more suited to a market with a limited customer base, and the process of discovering segments is based on interest in the offer or a similar offer the business may be able to provide. Because of this, a discovery-based approach is a much timelier process by which to determine the profitable segments. Both approaches can benefit from elements of the other and, in most situations, work well in unison with each other when determining a profitable and defined segment.

== Targeting ==
Targeting is a follow on process from segmentation, and is the process of actually determining the select markets and planning the advertising media used to make the segment appealing. Targeting is a changing environment. Traditional targeting practices of advertising through print and other media sources, has made way for a social media presence, leading a much more 'web-connected' focus. Behavioural targeting is a product of this change, and focuses on the optimization of online advertising and data collection to send a message to potential segments. This process is based around the collection of 'cookies', small pieces of information collected by a consumer's browser and sold to businesses to identify potential segments to appeal to. For example, someone consistently accessing photography based searches is likely to have advertisements for camera sales appear, due to the cookie information they deliver showing an interest in this area. Whilst targeting a market, there are three different market coverage choices to consider – undifferentiated, differentiated and niche marketing. Choosing which targeting choice to pursue depends on the product or service being offered. Undifferentiated marketing is the best option to focus on the market as a whole and to promote products that have a wide target segment, whilst differentiated and niche marketing are more specialized and focus on smaller, more selective segments.

== Positioning ==
Positioning is the final stage in the STP process and focuses on how the customer ultimately views your product or service in comparison to your competitors and is important in gaining a competitive advantage in the market. Therefore, customer perceptions have a huge impact on the brands positioning in the market. There are three types of positioning that are key in positioning the brand to a competitive advantage; these are functional positioning, symbolic positioning, and experiential positioning. Functional Positioning is focused on the aspects of the products or services that can fulfill consumers' needs or desires. Symbolic Positioning is based on the characteristics of the brand that fulfill customers' self-esteem. Experiential positioning is based around the characteristics of the brands that stimulate the sensory or emotional connection with the customers. A combination of the three is key to positioning the brand at a competitive advantage to its immediate competition. Overall, positioning should provide better value than competitors and communicate this differentiation in an effective way to the consumer.

== Persona ==
In marketing, the outcome of the STP process is a semi-fictional representation of a typical customer or user in each segment, often referred to as a "persona." The persona represents the most common traits and characteristics of the segment and help marketers communicate relevant market segments more effectively by humanizing data into relatable profiles.

== The STP framework in B2B ==
The STP process can also be used for business-to-business marketing. Although most variables used in segmenting the market are based on customer characteristics, business characteristics can be described using the variables which are not depending on the type of buyer. There are methods for creating a positioning statement for both B2C and B2B marketing.

== See also ==
- Commercial planning
- Competitor analysis
- Market research
- Market segmentation
- Positioning
- Target market
