= Marketing management =

Practical application of marketing in organizations

Marketing management is the strategic organizational discipline that focuses on the practical application of marketing orientation, techniques and methods inside enterprises and organizations and on the management of marketing resources and activities. Compare marketology, which Aghazadeh defines in terms of "recognizing, generating and disseminating market insight to ensure better market-related decisions".

== Structure ==
Marketing management employs tools from economics and competitive strategy to analyze the industry context in which the firm operates. These include Porter's five forces, analysis of strategic groups of competitors, value chain analysis and others.

In competitor analysis, marketers build detailed profiles of each competitor in the market, focusing on their relative competitive strengths and weaknesses using SWOT analysis. Marketing managers will examine each competitor's cost structure, sources of profits, resources and competencies, competitive positioning and product differentiation, degree of vertical integration, historical responses to industry developments, and other factors.

Marketing management often implies market research and marketing research to perform a primary analysis. For this, a variety of techniques are implemented. Some of the most common ones include:

- Qualitative marketing research, such as focus groups and various types of interviews
- Quantitative marketing research, such as statistical surveys
- Experimental techniques such as test markets
- Observational techniques such as ethnographic (on-site) observation

Marketing managers may also design and oversee various environmental scanning and competitive intelligence processes to identify trends and inform the company's marketing analysis.

Example of SWOT analysis chart

=== Brand audit ===
A brand audit is a thorough examination of a brand's current position in an industry compared to its competitors and the examination of its effectiveness. When it comes to brand auditing, six questions should be carefully examined and assessed:

1. How well the business's current brand strategy is working?
2. What are the company's established resource strengths and weaknesses?
3. What are its external opportunities and threats?
4. How competitive are the business' prices and costs?
5. How strong is the business's competitive position in comparison to its competitors?
6. What strategic issues are affecting the business?

When a business conducts a brand audit, the goal is to identify its resource strengths, weaknesses, assess market opportunities and external threats, future profitability, and its competitive standing in comparison to existing competitors. A brand audit establishes the strategic elements needed to improve the brand's positioning and competitive capabilities within the industry. Once a brand is audited, any business that ends up with strong financial performance and market position is likely to have a properly conceived and effectively executed brand strategy.

A brand audit examines whether a business's market share is increasing, decreasing, or remaining stable. It determines whether the company's profit margin is improving or declining and how it compares with that of established competitors. Additionally, a brand audit analyzes trends in net profits, return on investments, and overall economic value. It also evaluates whether the business's financial strength and credit rating are improving or deteriorating. Beyond financial metrics, a brand audit also assesses the business's image and reputation among its customers. It examines whether the business is perceived as an industry leader in areas such as technology, product or service innovation, and customer service. These factors play a significant role in shaping customer decisions and overall brand perception.

A brand audit usually focuses on a business' strengths and resource capabilities because these are the elements that enhance its competitiveness. A business' competitive strengths can exist in several forms including skilled or pertinent expertise, valuable physical and human assets, organizational assets and intangible assets, competitive capabilities, achievements and alliances or cooperative ventures that position the business into a competitive advantage.

The purpose of a brand audit is to determine whether a business’ resource strengths are competitive assets or potential liabilities. This type of audit seeks to ensure that a business maintains a distinctive competence that allows it to build and reinforce its competitive advantage. Furthermore, a well-executed brand audit seeks to establish what a business capitalizes on best, its level of expertise, resource strengths, and strongest competitive capabilities, while aiming to identify a business's current position and potential future performance.

=== Marketing strategy ===
Two customer segments are often selected as targets because they score highly on two dimensions:

1. The segment is attractive to serve because it is large, growing, makes frequent purchases, is not price sensitive (i.e. is willing to pay high prices), or other factors; and
2. The company has the resources and capabilities to compete for the segment's business, can meet their needs better than the competition, and can do so profitably.

A commonly cited definition of marketing is simply "meeting needs profitably".

The implication of selecting target segments is that the business will subsequently allocate more resources to acquire and retain customers in the target segments than it will for other, non-targeted customers. In some cases, the firm may go so far as to turn away customers who are not in its target segment. The doorman at a swanky nightclub, for example, may deny entry to unfashionably dressed individuals because the business has made a strategic decision to target the "high fashion" segment of nightclub patrons.

In conjunction with targeting decisions, marketing managers will identify the desired positioning they want the company, product, or brand to occupy in the target customer's mind. This positioning is often an encapsulation of a key benefit the company's product or service offers that is differentiated and superior to the benefits offered by competitive products. For example, Volvo has traditionally positioned its products in the automobile market in North America in order to be perceived as the leader in "safety", whereas BMW has traditionally positioned its brand to be perceived as the leader in "performance".

Ideally, a firm's positioning can be maintained over a long period of time because the company possesses or can develop, some form of sustainable competitive advantage. The positioning should also be sufficiently relevant to the target segment such that it will drive the purchasing behavior of target customers. To sum up, the marketing branch of a company is to deal with the selling and popularity of its products among people and its customers, as the central and eventual goal of a company is customer satisfaction and the return of revenue.

=== Implementation planning ===
The Marketing Metrics Continuum provides a framework for how to categorize metrics from the tactical to strategic.

If the company has obtained an adequate understanding of the customer base and its own competitive position in the industry, marketing managers are able to make their own key strategic decisions and develop a marketing strategy designed to maximize the revenues and profits of the firm. The selected strategy may aim for any of a variety of specific objectives, including optimizing short-term unit margins, revenue growth, market share, long-term profitability, or other goals.

After the firm's strategic objectives have been identified, the target market selected, and the desired positioning for the company, product, or brand has been determined, marketing managers focus on how to best implement the chosen strategy. Traditionally, this has involved implementation planning across the "4 Ps": product management, pricing (at what price slot does a producer position a product, e.g. low, medium, or high price), place (the place or area where the products are going to be sold, which could be local, regional, countrywide or international) (i.e. sales and distribution channels), and promotion.

Taken together, the company's implementation choices across the 4 P's are often described as the marketing mix, meaning the mix of elements the business will employ to "go to market" and execute the marketing strategy. The overall goal for the marketing mix is to consistently deliver a compelling value proposition that reinforces the firm's chosen positioning, builds customer loyalty and brand equity among target customers, and achieves the firm's marketing and financial objectives.

In many cases, marketing management will develop a marketing plan to specify how the company will execute the chosen strategy and achieve the business's objectives. The content of marketing plans varies for each firm, but commonly includes:

- An executive summary
- Situation analysis to summarize facts and insights gained from market research and marketing analysis
- The company's mission statement or long-term strategic vision
- A statement of the company's key objectives often subdivided into marketing objectives and financial objectives
- The marketing strategy the business has chosen, specifying the target segments to be pursued and the competitive positioning to be achieved
- Implementation choices for each element of the marketing mix (the 4 Ps)

=== Project, process, and vendor management ===
More broadly, marketing managers work to design and improve the effectiveness of core marketing processes, such as new product development, brand management, marketing communications, and pricing. Marketers may employ the tools of business process re-engineering to ensure these processes are properly designed, and use a variety of process management techniques to keep them operating smoothly.

Effective execution may require management of both internal resources and a variety of external vendors and service providers, such as the firm's advertising agency. Marketers may therefore coordinate with the company's purchasing department on the procurement of these services. Under the area of marketing agency management (i.e. working with external marketing agencies and suppliers) are techniques such as agency performance evaluation, scope of work, incentive compensation, ERFx's and storage of agency information in a supplier database.

=== Reporting, measurement, feedback and control systems ===
Marketing management employs a variety of metrics to measure progress against objectives. It is the responsibility of marketing managers to ensure that the execution of marketing programs achieves the desired objectives and does so in a cost-efficient manner.

Marketing management therefore often makes use of various organizational control systems, such as sales forecasts, and sales force and reseller incentive programs, sales force management systems, and customer relationship management tools (CRM). Some software vendors have begun using the term customer data platform or marketing resource management to describe systems that facilitate an integrated approach for controlling marketing resources. In some cases, these efforts may be linked to various supply chain management systems, such as enterprise resource planning (ERP), material requirements planning (MRP), efficient consumer response (ECR), and inventory management systems.

=== International marketing management ===
Globalization has led some firms to market beyond the borders of their home countries, making international marketing a part of those firms' marketing strategy. Marketing managers are often responsible for influencing the level, timing, and composition of customer demand. In part, this is because the role of a marketing manager (or sometimes called managing marketer in small- and medium-sized enterprises) can vary significantly based on a business's size, corporate culture, and industry context. For example, in small and medium-sized enterprises, the managing marketer may contribute to both managerial and marketing operations roles for the company brands. In a large consumer products company, the marketing manager may act as the overall general manager of his or her assigned product. To create an effective, cost-efficient marketing management strategy, firms must possess a detailed, objective understanding of their own business and the market in which they operate. In analyzing these issues, the discipline of marketing management often overlaps with the related discipline of strategic planning.

== See also ==
- Marketing effectiveness
- Predictive analytics
- Strategic management
- Outline of marketing
