= SOSTAC =

Marketing model

SOSTAC is a marketing model developed by PR Smith in the 1990s and later formalized in his 1998 book Marketing Communications, the subsequent series of SOSTAC Guides to your Perfect Plan (2011) and the SOSTAC Guide to your Perfect Digital Marketing Plan (2020) and now the SOSTAC Guide to your Perfect Digital Marketing Plan 2025, (the AI Edition). SOSTAC was voted in the Top 3 Business Models worldwide by the Chartered Institute of Marketing. PR Smith explains SOSTAC in 3 minutes, on video at SOSTAC.org where professionals can become SOSTAC Certified Planners. Alternatively PRSmith.org/sostac contains more insights into SOSTAC.

SOSTAC is an acronym for Smith's six fundamental facets of marketing: situation, objectives, strategy, tactics, action and control.

SOSTAC contains a general marketing strategy which can be applied in various commercial situations. It includes an in-depth SWOT analysis, which helps businesses get ready for marketing campaigns; the main difference is that SOSTAC also focuses on the implementation stages of the process, on marketing communications and now, digital marketing.

The structure of SOSTAC is a simple logic that builds on an in-depth Situation Analysis which informs subsequent decisions made about strategy and tactics. Its logic can enable better decision making and therefore better plans .

Marketing experts have adapted SOSTAC to a number of specific situations, including direct marketing and electronic marketing. The steps in the process have also been adapted to the development of internet security systems and company business plans.

== Steps in SOSTAC ==
- Situation assesses where a business is presently (where are you now?).
- Objectives set the mission or goals for the business (where do you want to be?).
- Strategy is an overview of how to achieve the objectives (how do you get there?).
- Tactics are the details of strategy (e.g. the marketing mix) (how exactly do we get there?)
- Actions how do you ensure excellent execution of the plan. (what is our plan?)
- Control establishes how you know whether you are getting there (what do you monitor?).
