= Go-to-market strategy =

Economic plan for businesses

A go-to-market strategy, or GTM strategy, is a plan of an organization using outside resources (e.g., sales force and distributors) to deliver their unique value proposition to customers ("go-to-market") and to achieve a competitive advantage. It can improve the overall customer experience by not only offering a better product or more competitive pricing, but also creating a framework and plan to enter a defined market and target their particular audience.

== Development ==
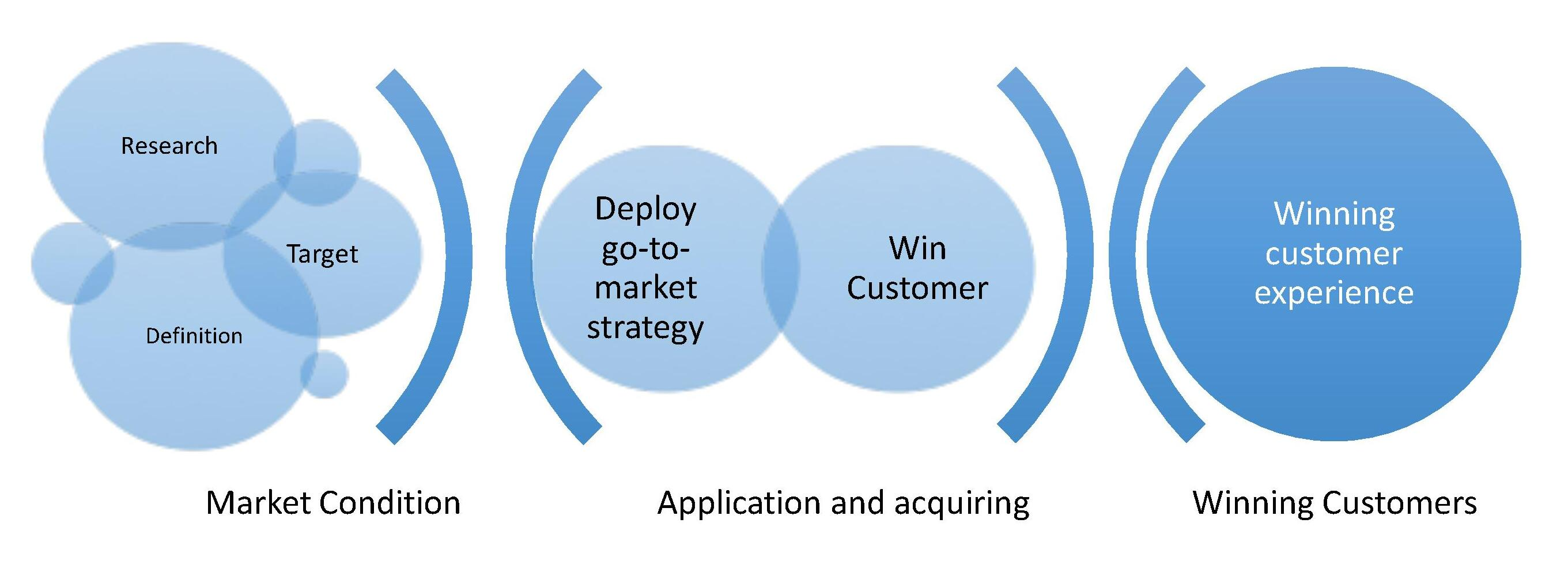
Processes of a go-to-market strategy

In the early stages of developing a go-to-market strategy for a new good or service, a company has to initially define the target market. The company then must determine whether they already have prospective customers within their customer base who are using different services.

After defining the target market, the good or service is researched, until a final decision is made on the value proposition. The company then determines its pricing tactics. It is very challenging to decide what pricing tactics to follow as it differs from one good or service to another, or even when the good or service remains the same but the tactics change, such as switching to subscription-based pricing (an example of this is Adobe's major shift from selling its Creative Suite software as a single purchase, which included all Adobe's products such as Photoshop and Illustrator, to a $50-per-month Creative Cloud and various other subscription plans).

Choosing the right distribution and marketing channels, followed by promotion, are also vital in a go-to-market strategy. The company has to decide which distribution model to choose, what kind of support and services are required, and address the possibility of creating a competitive advantage. Then, the company decides how it is going to promote its goods or services and what kind of marketing campaigns are the most influential to follow.

== Driving factors ==
When considering developing a go-to-market strategy, there are three factors to focus on: customers, the company, and market competition.

=== Customers ===
A focus on customer experiences leads to customer loyalty, which consequently triggers increased product purchase, customer retention, and low service cost.

Customers may be unaware of a company or its offerings but may represent the desired customer base. From a marketing standpoint, visiting a company's website, attending a webinar, or responding to an email may increase customer engagement.

The first conversion point is the marketing-qualified lead (MQL), a potential customer whose interest, such as a "Contact Us" form or a demo request, has been reviewed by the company's marketing team.

=== Company ===
When performing a go-to-market strategy, the company's mission and vision are key factors. Moreover, motivating employee performance can contribute to go-to-market strategy. Thus, defining a company's vision and the impact it is trying to create is a part of the earliest stages of a go-to-market strategy.

=== Competition ===
Understanding the competition is involved when deciding what product or service to offer. Research may include how competitors are performing in the market, what customers think of the different products available, and what is missing in the market through conducting research using different methods such as SWOT and PEST analyses.

== Market segmentation ==
Market segmentation is a process by which one divides prospective customers into different groups (segments) that have common needs and the same expected reaction to a marketing action. The process enables companies to offer customers a full value proposition of their products or services.

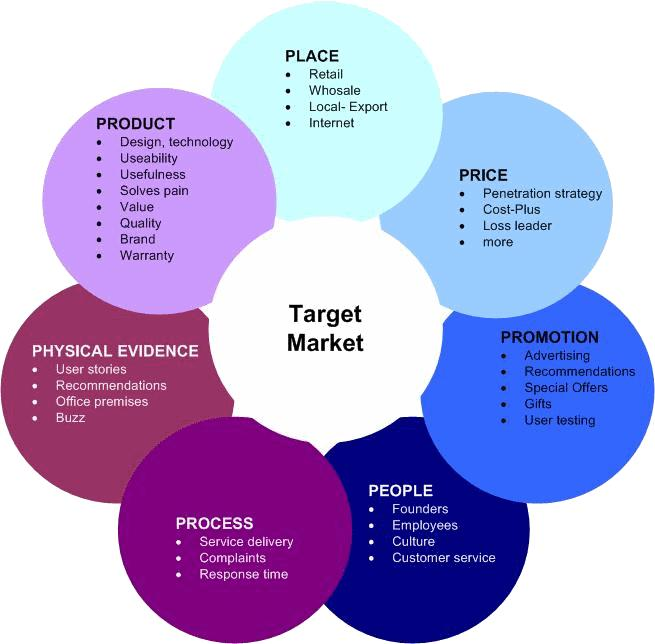
7 Marketing P's. Used in targeting and defining a market in a go-to-market strategy.

Some of the common factors that are considered when performing a market segmentation in a go-to-market strategy include:

- Industry: The industry in which the customer is involved
- Customer size and sales potential of the customer
- Customer behavior: Studying the customer's behavior related to the product or service such as the customer buying from a competitor or examining the responsiveness to selling effort
- Geography: Geographical locations of prospective buyers
- Application and use of the product or service by the customer
- Benefits earned by the customer due to buying the product or service
- Information that is required to be provided by the company to the customer
- Usage situation: When and where the product or service is used
- Profitability of selling to a certain customer

== Comparison to marketing strategy ==
Marketing strategy includes every marketing activity that helps an organization target the market after conducting market research.

The go-to-market strategy usually develops during the introduction of new products or services. Marketing strategy covers:

- the products or services of a business
- market share and position of those products and services
- identification of clients and competitors
- basics of a marketing plan

== Example ==
An example of using a go-to-market strategy can be observed in the automobile insurance industry. Initially, a company has to choose the right segment of the market (market segmentation). If the customers are considered individual households, then the company works on creating interest in their prospective customers using different forms of media, such as TV advertisements, social media, and billboards. Once potential customers express interest, they can purchase the service through various distribution channels, such as the company website or licensed agents.

In the case of customers being corporate accounts during the market segmentation, interest creation and purchase are done through direct sales, agents, or the Internet. Teleservice and direct-service representatives serve as contacts after the purchase.

== See also ==
- Marketing
- Market segmentation
- Marketing plan
- Marketing strategy
