= Microenvironment =

Microenvironment may refer to:

- Microenvironment (biology), a small or relatively small usually distinctly specialized and effectively isolated biophysical environment (as of a nerve cell)
- Microenvironment (ecology), also known as a microhabitat, a very small, specific area in a habitat, distinguished from its immediate surroundings by factors such as the amount of incident light, the degree of moisture, and the range of temperatures
- Microenvironment (business), nearby factors that affect a company's ability to serve its customers, such as the company itself, suppliers, marketing intermediaries, customer markets and the public
