= Strategic early warning system =

A strategic early warning system (SEWS) is a system that can be put in place at an organization to detect and deal with new patterns, trends, or events at an early stage. Its aim is to assist organizations in dealing with environmental changes or strategic surprises. By detecting weak signals (Igor Ansoff, 1975), which can be perceived as important discontinuities in an organizational environment, SEWS allows organizations to react strategically ahead of time.

== Theory ==
The concept of a SEWS is intended to be an important part of a strategic management system, operating real-time in an organization, and assisting in identifying the new, which emerge as those "weak signals".

Detecting weak signals is achieved by scanning the organizational environment. The concept of environmental scanning (Aguilar, 1967) describes a process whereby the environment in which an organization operates is systematically scanned for relevant information. The purpose is to identify early signals of possible environmental change and to detect environmental change already underway.

The need for a formal strategic early warning process in organizations is based in large part on the existence of blindspots, which prevents leaders and executives from identifying weak signals of change (Gilad, 1998). Any formal SEWS process must incorporate blindspots analysis as part of its cycle.

The system must be able to detect symptoms and weak signals outside and in the company and sent to a competent employee who will carry out an analysis of the cause of this state and confirm or deny negative development that might lead to a crisis situation (Zuzak, 2001).

== Phases ==
The ideal SEWS process has three phases.

- Phase 1 is characterised by the information gathering of "weak signals", or trends and issues. The scanning itself relies primarily on examining various media sources, the technique of content analysis (Nasbitt, 1982).

The scanning activity is complemented by monitoring trends and issues that have already drawn attention.

- Phase 2 is one of diagnosis, which is characterized by three steps:
  - In-depth analysis of the trend or issue, examining the core and the various contexts of this phenomenon. The aim is to gain an impression of the possible potential development of an issue or trend. Stakeholder theory may be used to understand actors in a specific industry (Comai and Tena, 2006).
  - The second step has two main objectives.
    - An attempt should be made to think creatively about how the particular trend or issue could evolve.
    - The nature of the contexts needs to be examined in order to cluster several trends or issues, thus providing an understanding of the mutual influences on and of trends and issues.
  - In the final step, due to the limited resources in any organization, identify and select those trends and issues that are particularly relevant.
- Phase 3 involves the formulation of an appropriate strategy to react to the trends and issues which have been identified and labelled as relevant.
