= Total addressable market =

Revenue opportunity available for a product or service

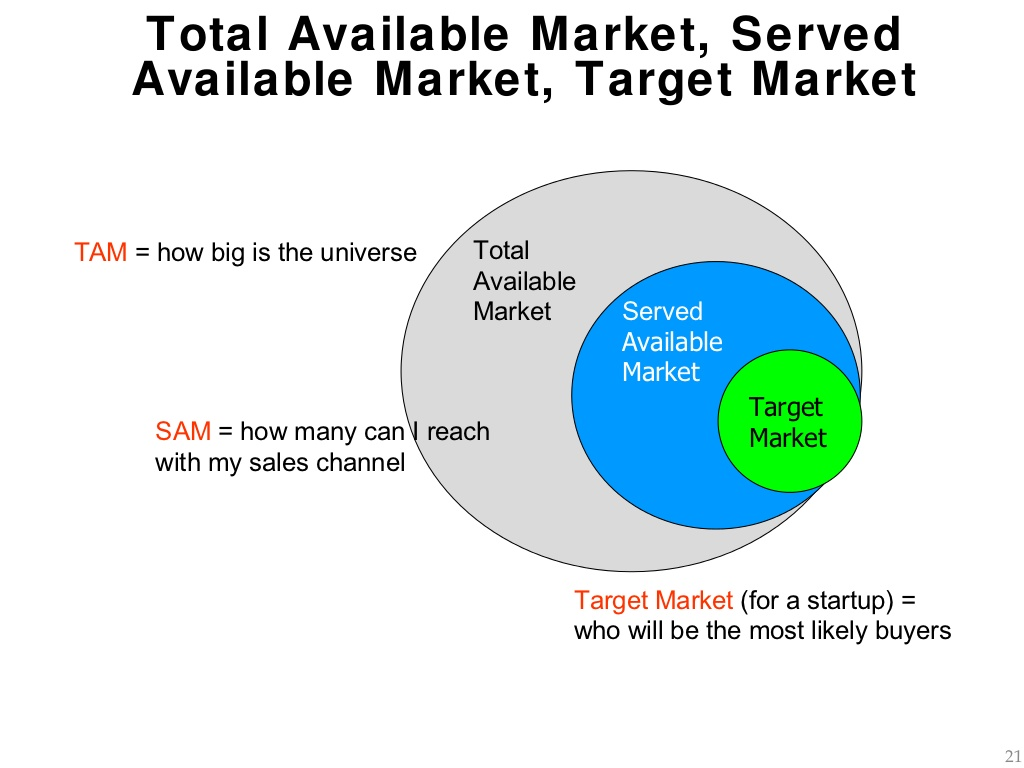
An Euler diagram showing the relationship between total available market (TAM), served (or serviceable) available market, and target market

Total addressable market (TAM), also called total available market, is a term that is typically used to reference the revenue opportunity for a product or service. TAM helps prioritize business opportunities by serving as a size metric of a given opportunity's underlying potential.

TAM can be defined as a global total (even if a particular company could not reach some of it) or, more commonly, a sub-market that one specific product or service could serve (within realistic expansion scenarios). The inclusion of constraints such as distribution and competition challenges then modifies the concept, reducing the market down to the serviceable available market (SAM), the percentage of the market that can be served (either by that company or all providers) out of the TAM. This is occasionally referred to as PAU (Potential Active Use). Competitive dynamics reduce the SAM to SOM.

== Difference between TAM, SAM and SOM ==
Total addressable market (TAM), or total available market, is the total market demand for a product or service, calculated in annual revenue or unit sales if 100% of the available market is achieved.

Serviceable available market (SAM) is the portion of TAM that is reachable by a company's distribution footprint. The SAM may be the same as the Target Market, but a Target Market can also be a subset of the SAM. For example, a beverage company may be able to reach a broad range of customers with its products and distribution footprint, but choose only to serve high end bars.

Serviceable obtainable market (SOM) is the share of SAM which is realistically achieved by a company. It is an estimate of future market share. It should be understood as a subset of a Target Market.

For example, the total UK consumer expenditure on food in 2014, which is the total addressable market of food, was £198 billion (including catering, alcoholic drinks, non-alcoholic drinks and other foods). The serviceable available market for alcoholic drinks, which producers of alcoholic beverages target and serve, is £49 billion. Since the market for alcoholic drinks is not a monopoly, the market share for a company producing alcoholic beverages can never reach 100% of SAM.

Related but distinct concepts include Target Market and market share. The Target Market logically sits between SAM and SOM, although in practice Target market is often conflated with TAM, SAM and SOM. Following the process of the STP framework established by Wind and Cardozo (1974, “Industrial Market Segmentation.” Industrial Marketing Management), the Target Market is a subset of SAM. Therefore SOM is a subset of the Target Market. Market share is the current share of a given target market

== Importance ==
The total addressable market shows the potential scale of the market. Estimating TAM is the first step for entrepreneurs to start up their business. It is important to estimate TAM objectively instead of exaggerating or underestimating this value with subjective attitudes, as it is vital to allocate a suitable market with potential growing capacity. Investors often tend to look for markets with high TAM values, showing confidence in such markets with great potential to increase demand for their products and services. This is a reasonable deduction, while on the other hand, a high value of TAM is not necessarily a good sign, as the total available market does not mean the high degree of demand obtained. Some other factors, such as competition level in the market, accessibility of resources, etc. would also affect the performance of the company. Hence SAM and SOM are also critical indicators to measure if the market is worth investing.

== Illustrations of real-world news about TAM ==
- The Morgan Stanley analyst Katy Huberty said in her 2015 research report that Apple could reach $3.4 trillion of total addressable market by 2020, from $800 billion in 2015, since it expands into new markets such as cars.
- Alibaba still has potential to incredibly increase total addressable market up to 40%, stated by Jim O'Donnell, Chief Investment Officer of Forward Management, as he believes Alibaba is expanding not only China's market but also markets outside China.
- The total addressable market for pulsed RF power semiconductor keeps increasing despite degeneration in the market for wireless infrastructure, as manufacturers are stepping into the new markets for pulsed RF power semiconductors such as transportation and military.
- The general public poorly realizes the market size for microwave tubes (valves). Yet, its total addressable market has reached nearly $1 billion, as microwave tubes are commonly used in areas such as military, medical and space communication applications.
- The total addressable market for comparators (a device used to compare two currents or voltages) reached $173 million in 2003. It would get $273 million in 2009.
- The market for contracted manufacturing services keeps growing compared with electronics manufacturing services (EMS) and original design manufacturers (ODM). Its serviceable obtainable market reached $560 million in 2001 and has a potential to obtain 27% of the total addressable market of electronics and IT industry by 2006, stated by Kevin Kane, program manager for IDC's Contract Manufacturing Services.

== See also ==
- Demographic profile
- Market segmentation
- Mass marketing
- Niche market
- Precision marketing
- Serviceable available market
- Target market
