= Multi-domestic strategy =

A multi-domestic strategy is a strategy by which companies try to achieve maximum local responsiveness by customizing both their product offering and marketing strategy to match different national conditions. Production, marketing, and R&D activities tend to be established in each major national market where business is done.

An alternate use of the term describes the organization of multi-national firms. International or multinational companies gain economies of scale through shared overhead, and market similar products in multiple countries. Multi-domestic companies have separate headquarters in different countries, thereby attaining more localized management, but at the higher cost of forgoing the economies of scale from cost sharing and centralization.
