= Conditional rebate =

Promotional marketing strategy

A conditional rebate is a sales-based promotion typically used by retailers to increase their sales, generate traffic and create publicity. The rebate is commonly an element of a marketing strategy and an advertising campaign. With this specific type of rebate, a company typically offers a certain amount of their product, or some sort of sales incentive, if a particular circumstance (i.e. condition) arises.

== Operation ==
A conditional rebate revolves around an "if, then…" proposition (in this case: if x happens, then y will be awarded to the participating customers). The conditional rebate is typically used with sports- or weather-related conditions. In order to protect themselves from the risk of making such an offer, companies turn to specialty insurers to purchase either conditional rebate coverage or promotional weather coverage, where they will pay a premium based on the odds of the "condition" taking place. Conditional rebate insurance can be a very effective marketing strategy for retailers because for a fixed fee the company eliminates the risk associated with repaying their customers in the event of a claim since the risk has been transferred to the insurance company after the policy is purchased.

As an example, a retailer might want to insure the following: if a particular National Football League team returns the opening kickoff of a game or season for a touchdown, then the customer who made a purchase during the specified promotional period will get a 100% rebate on their purchase. Another example is that of a conditional weather rebate where if there is snow on New Year's Day the customer will receive a full refund of all purchases made during the month of November.

== Rating ==
Insurance companies rate conditional rebates based upon a variety of factors. If the conditional rebate is weather-themed it will be based on the location of the event (city/state) and history of the weather condition that is being underwritten (temperature, rain, snow, etc.) as well as the limit of the policy that is being insured.

Sports-themed conditional rebates are rated based on not only the size of the policy, but the history of the particular sports team. This is not only limited to how many wins that particular team has had, but the number of home runs or other circumstances that are being insured under a conditional rebate.
