= Serviceable available market =

Reachable part of the possible market

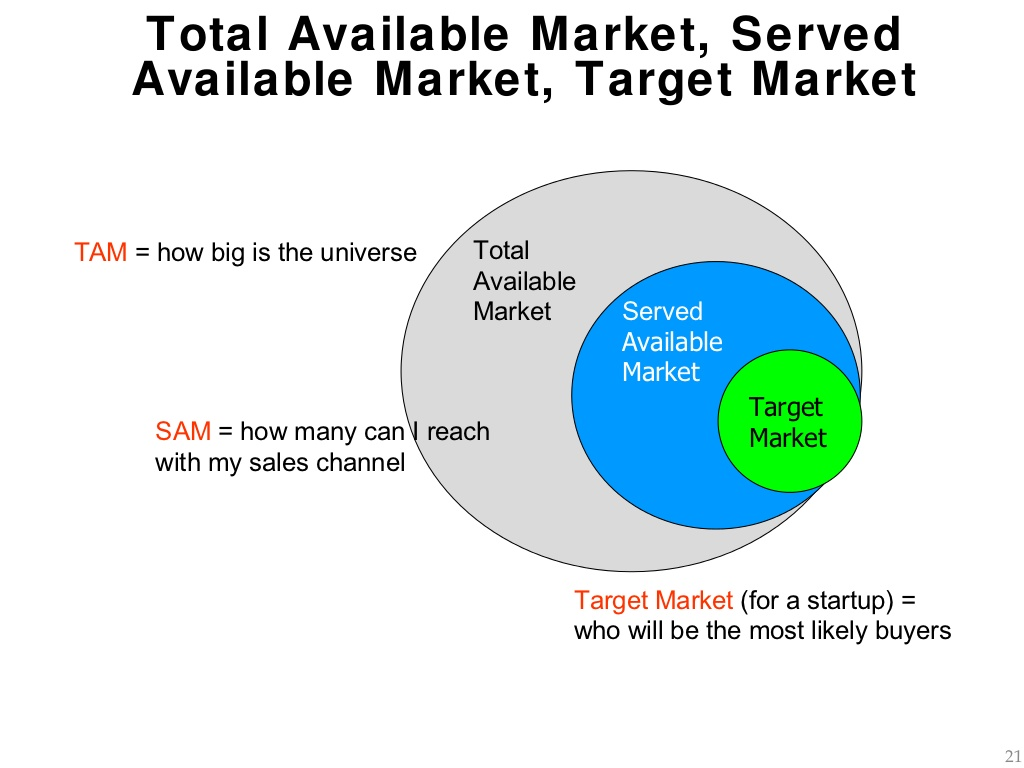
Total Available Market (TAM), Serviceable (or Served) Available Market, and Target Market.

Serviceable addressable market (SAM; also served available market) is the part of the total addressable market (TAM) that can actually be reached.

== Overview ==
The serviceable available market or served addressable market is more clearly defined as that market opportunity that exists within a firm's existing core competencies and/or past performance. The biggest consideration when calculating SAM is that a firm most likely can only service markets that are core or directly adjacent to its current customer base. As examples:

- Consider a firm that plans to become a niche solution provider in the Healthcare market. It is unlikely that the firm will quickly be able to capture market share in manufacturing without significant investments in market expansion.
- In telecommunications where a service provider is expanding into a new market that is dominated by an incumbent that has existing infrastructure investments in place, the incumbent raises the barriers to entry in that market and therefore market analysis will not count that market as serviceable.

== See also ==
- Total addressable market
- Market segmentation
- Target market
