= Francis J. Aguilar =

American scholar

Francis Joseph Aguilar
- Born: August 19, 1932
- Died: February 17, 2013 (aged 80)
- Education: Rensselaer Polytechnic Institute (RPI), Harvard Business School
- Occupations: Scholar, professor, consultant
- Employer: Harvard Business School
- Known for: Development of PEST analysis, strategic planning
- Notable work: Scanning the Business Environment (1967); European Problems in General Management (1963); General Managers in Action (1988, 1992)
- Board member of: Dynamic Research Corporation, Bentley University

Francis Joseph Aguilar (August 19, 1932 – February 17, 2013) was an American scholar of strategic planning and general management. He joined the faculty of Harvard Business School in 1964 and became a tenured professor there in 1971. He served as consultant to many firms and on the boards of Dynamic Research Corporation and Bentley University. He developed the PEST analysis framework, which helps businesses assess external factors that may impact their operations.

His publications include: Scanning the Business Environment (1967), European Problems in General Management (with Edmund P. Learned and Robert C.K. Kaltz, 1963) and General Managers in Action (1988, 1992).

He graduated from RPI and Harvard Business School.

== Archives and records ==
- Francis J. Aguilar papers at Baker Library Special Collections, Harvard Business School
