= Pricing objectives =

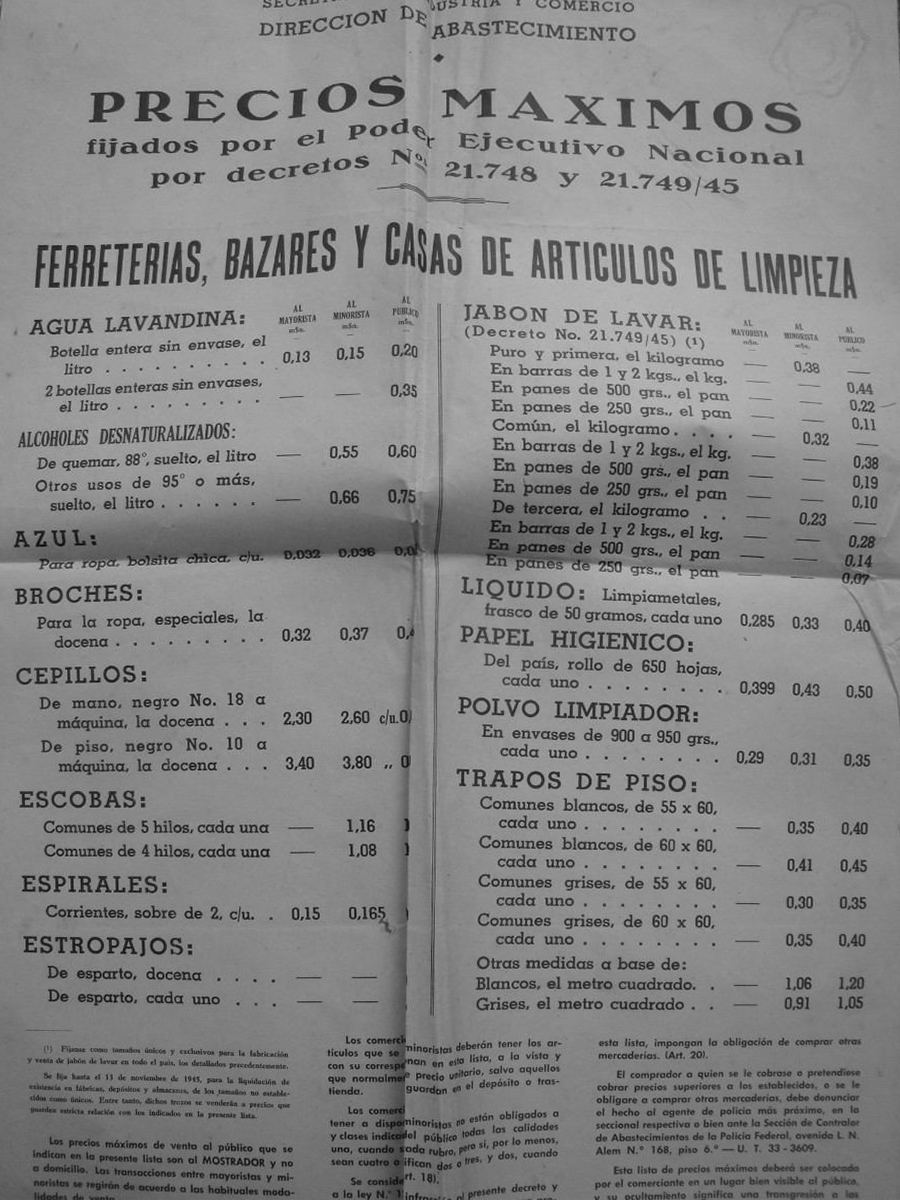
List price cap established by the Argentine government of Edelmiro Farrell in 1945.

Pricing objectives (or goals) is a term used in marketing and economics to provide direction to the whole pricing process. This involves determining overall objectives that include the following: 1) the overall financial, marketing, and strategic objectives of the company; 2) the objectives of the product or brand; 3) consumer price elasticity and price points (the prevailing market condition); and 4) the resources available to the company.

== Common pricing objectives ==
Some of the more common pricing objectives are:

- maximize long-run profit
- maximize short-run profit
- increase sales volume (quantity)
- increase monetary sales
- increase market share
- obtain a target rate of return on investment (ROI)
- obtain a target rate of return on sales
- stabilize market or stabilize market price: an objective to stabilize price means that the marketing manager attempts to keep prices stable in the marketplace and to compete on non-price considerations. Stabilization of margin is basically a cost-plus approach in which the manager attempts to maintain the same margin regardless of changes in cost.
- company growth
- maintain price leadership
- desensitize customers to price
- discourage new entrants into the industry
- match competitors prices
- encourage the exit of marginal firms from the industry
- survival
- avoid government investigation or intervention
- obtain or maintain the loyalty and enthusiasm of distributors and other sales personnel
- enhance the image of the firm, brand, or product
- be perceived as “fair” by customers and potential customers
- create interest and excitement about a product
- discourage competitors from cutting prices
- use price to make the product “visible"
- help prepare for the sale of the business (harvesting)
- social, ethical, or ideological objectives

== See also ==
- Price
- Price controls
- Price fixing
- Price gouging
- Just price
- Resale price maintenance
- Pricing
- Pricing strategies
