= Strategy gap =

Gap between current and desired performance of organization

A strategy gap refers to the gap between the current performance of an organisation and its desired performance as expressed in its mission, objectives, goals and the strategy for achieving them. Mckeown argues that a strategic gap may be transformed into a strategic stretch.

Often unseen, the strategy gap is a threat to the future performance—and even survival—of an organisation and is guaranteed to impact upon the efficiency and effectiveness of senior executives and their management teams. The strategy gap is considered to be real and exists within most organisations. An article in Fortune magazine (June 1999 edition) stated that some 70% of CEOs' failures were the result of poor execution rather than poor strategies.

There are various schools of thought on what causes the gap between vision and execution, and how the strategy gap might be avoided. In 2005, Paul R. Niven, a thought leader in performance management systems, pinpointed four sources for the gap between strategy and execution, namely lack of vision, people, management and resources. He argued that few understand the organisation's strategy and as most employees' pay is linked to short-term financial results, maximising short-term gains becomes the foremost priority which leads to less rational decision making. Management is spending little attention to the linkage between strategy and financial planning. Unless the strategic initiatives are properly funded and resourced, their failure is virtually assured.

In the book The Strategy Gap: Leveraging Technology to Execute Winning, the authors argue that the main causes of the strategy gap could be grouped into three areas, each of which interacts with the others. These three areas are the way management acts to implement strategic initiatives (management induced gaps), traditional processes (for example, budgeting, forecasting, reporting) used to implement strategy (process induced gaps) and technology systems used to support those processes (technology induced gaps).
