= Marketing plan =

Outline to execute a marketing objective

A marketing plan is a strategic document developed to achieve specific marketing objectives. It outlines a company's advertising and promotional activities for a defined period, describes the organization's current marketing position, and identifies the target market and marketing mix that will be used to achieve stated goals.

Marketing plans are typically developed by marketing managers in collaboration with product managers, product marketing managers, and sales teams.A marketing plan usually forms part of a broader business plan.

A comprehensive marketing plan may include historical performance data, market analysis, future projections, strategic approaches to achieving objectives, and an assessment of the organization's strengths and weaknesses, including those of its products and overall structure.

== Objectives ==
Acquiring marketing share, increasing customer awareness, and building a favorable business image are some of the objectives that can be related to marketing planning. The marketing plan also helps layout the necessary budget and resources needed to achieve the goals stated in the marketing plan. It is able to show what the company is intended to accomplish within the budget and also makes it possible for company executives to assess potential return on the investment of marketing dollars.

The marketing plan offers an opportunity for a productive discussion between employees and leaders of an organisation. The marketing plan also allows the marketing team to examine their past decisions and understand their results in order to better prepare for the future. It also lets the marketing team to observe and study the environment that they are operating in.

== Components ==
Marketing plans start with the identification of customer needs through a market research and how the business can satisfy these needs while generating an acceptable return. Recent industry research has highlighted the role of briefing in this process, suggesting that unclear or poorly constructed marketing briefs can lead to misalignment between stakeholders and reduce the effectiveness of marketing execution, while well-defined briefs may improve strategic alignment and outcomes.This includes processes such as market mix, research, situation analysis, segmentation, strategies, budgets, financial forecasts, competitive strategies, objective setting, and results monitoring. The marketing plan also shows the actions that will be taken, and the resources to be applied, in order to achieve planned goals. Marketing planning can also be used to prepare a detailed case for introducing a new product or revamping current marketing strategies for existing products.

A complete marketing plan may include:

1. Executive summary
2. Market research
  1. Market environment (e.g. economic, legal, governmental, technological, ecological, sociocultural, supply chain)
  2. Market analysis (e.g. market size, segmentation, industry structure, competitive analysis)
  3. Consumer analysis (e.g. participants, demographics, psychographics)
  4. Internal analysis (e.g. company finances, people, time, skills; objectives, mission statement, vision statement; organizational culture)
  5. Situation analysis (e.g. external threats and opportunities, internal strengths and weaknesses, critical success factors, sustainable competitive advantage)
3. Objective setting
4. Marketing Strategy
  1. Product management (e.g. unique selling proposition, product mix, perceptual mapping, product life cycle management and new product development, branding; product portfolio analysis: BCG analysis, contribution margin analysis, GE multifactorial analysis, quality function deployment)
  2. Segmented marketing actions and market share objectives
  3. Pricing (e.g. objectives, strategy, discounts and allowances, price elasticity, price zoning, break-even analysis)
  4. Promotion (e.g. promotional mix, advertising, sales promotion, publicity, public relations, word-of-mouth marketing, viral marketing)
  5. Distribution
5. Implementation (e.g. personnel, financial, management information systems, results monitoring, contingencies, project management)
6. Financial Summary (e.g. pro-forma monthly income statement)
7. Scenarios
8. Controls (e.g. performance indicators, feedback mechanisms)

=== Research ===
Marketing research can be either internal or external. Internal research refers to creating better experiences and products for existing customers, while external research involves looking to gain new customers.

=== Objective setting ===
James Quinn defined objectives as "stat[ing] what is to be achieved and when results are to be accomplished", but not "how the results are to be achieved". Marketing objectives typically relate to what products will be where in what markets, based on customer behavior in those markets. Other objectives in a marketing plan include those for pricing, distribution, and advertising. Quinn describes marketing plans as generally concerned with "8 Ps": Price, Product, Promotion, Place, People, Physical environment, Process, and Packaging.

It is important to put both quantities and timescales into the marketing objectives.

=== Implementation ===
Marketing plans typically use budgets, schedules and marketing metrics for monitoring and evaluating results. With budget, they can compare planned expenditures with actual expenditures for given period. Schedules allow management to see when tasks were supposed to be completed and when they actually were. Marketing metrics tracks actual outcomes of marketing programs to see whether the company is moving forward towards its objectives. Apart from metrics, a specific action plan allows a marketing plan to better measure results and that criteria are met.

Elements of marketing performance that may be tracked include sales analysis, market share analysis, expense analysis, and financial analysis (including figures such as profit, return on investment and contribution).

== See also ==
- Business plan
- Marketing
- Marketing management
- Strategic management
- Product differentiation
