= Category development index (marketing) =

The category development index (CDI) measures the sales performance of a category of goods or services in a specific group, compared with its average performance among all consumers. By definition, CDI measures the sales strength of a particular product category within a specific market (e.g., soft drinks in 10–50 year olds).

== Purpose ==
The purpose of the CDI metric is to quantify the relative performance of a category within specified customer groups. The CDI helps marketers identify strong and weak segments (usually demographic or geographic) for categories of goods and services.

The CDI is useful in all marketing strategies when used with the Brand Development Index (BDI). The CDI can give vital data for marketers to allocate advertising to specific areas maximizing product category knowledge and profit.

== Construction ==
CDI: An index of how well a category performs in a given market segment, relative to its performance in the market as a whole.

CDI (I) =
[Category sales to group (#) ÷ Households in group (#)] ÷
[Total category sales (#) ÷ Total households (#)]
Note: Although defined here with respect to households, these indexes could also be calculated for customers, accounts, businesses, or other entities.

For example, Boston enjoys high per capita consumption of ice cream. Bavaria and Ireland show higher per capita consumption of beer than Iran.

== See also ==
- Brand development index
