= PEST analysis =

Business analysis framework

In business analysis, PEST analysis (political, economic, social and technological) is a framework of external macro-environmental factors used in strategic management and market research.

PEST analysis was developed in 1967 by Francis Aguilar as an environmental scanning framework for businesses to understand the external conditions and relations of a business in order to assist managers in strategic planning. It has also been termed ETPS analysis.

PEST analyses give an overview of the different macro-environmental factors to be considered by a business, indicating market growth or decline, business position, as well as the potential of and direction for operations.

== Components ==
The basic PEST analysis includes four factors: political, economic, social, and technological.

=== Political ===
Political factors relate to how the governments intervene in economies.

Specifically, political factors comprise areas including tax policy, labour law, environmental law, trade restrictions, tariffs, and political stability. Other factors include what are considered merit goods and demerit goods by a government, and the impact of governments on health, education, and infrastructure of a nation.

=== Economic ===
Economic factors include economic growth, exchange rates, inflation rate, and interest rates.

=== Social ===
Social factors may extend to cultural factors, including health consciousness, population growth rate, age distribution, career attitudes and safety emphasis. Trends in social conditions affect the demand for a company's products and how they are obtained, e.g. a shift away from city centre shopping to out-of-town locations might affect how a company operates. Similarly social factors affect supply, employment factors and workforce matters. Through analysis of social factors, companies may adopt various management strategies to adapt to social trends.

=== Technological ===
Technological factors include R&D activity, automation, technology incentives and the rate of technological change. These can determine barriers to entry, minimum efficient production level and influence the outsourcing decisions. Technological shifts would also affect costs, quality, and innovation.

== Variants ==
Many similar frameworks have been constructed, with the addition of other components such as environment and law. These include PESTLE, PMESII-PT, STEPE, STEEP, STEEPLE, STEER, and TELOS.

=== Legal and regulatory ===
Legal factors include discrimination law, consumer law, antitrust law, employment law, and health and safety law, and the law of carriage and transport, which can affect how a company operates, its costs, and the demand for its products. Regulatory factors have also been analysed as a separate pillar.

=== Environment ===
Environmental factors include ecological and environmental aspects such as weather and climate, which may especially affect industries such as tourism, farming, and insurance. Environmental analyses often use the PESTLE framework, which allow for the evaluation of factors affecting management decisions for coastal zone and freshwater resources, development of sustainable buildings, sustainable energy solutions, and transportation.

=== Demographic ===
Demographic factors have been considered in frameworks such as STEEPLED. Factors include gender, age, ethnicity, knowledge of languages, disabilities, mobility, home ownership, employment status, religious belief or practice, culture and tradition, living standards and income level.

=== Military ===
Military analyses have used the PMESII-PT framework, which considers political, military, economic, social, information, infrastructure, physical environment and time aspects in a military context.

=== Operational ===
The TELOS framework explores technical, economic, legal, operational, and scheduling factors in the context of project management and feasibility studies.

== Limitations ==
PEST analysis can be helpful to explain market changes in the past, but it is not always suitable to predict or foresee upcoming market changes. The macro-environment is highly fluid, and factors can shift unpredictably.

Tovstiga and Aylward warn against the danger of listing factors without understanding their "cause-and-effect relationship" with business activities and market outcomes: "it is all too easy to produce lists of factors ... developing a clear understanding" about these relationships is "more challenging".

== See also ==
- Enterprise planning systems
- Macromarketing
- SWOT analysis
- VRIO
