= Strategic group =

A strategic group is a concept used in strategic management that groups companies within an industry that have similar business models or similar combinations of strategies. For example, the restaurant industry can be divided into several strategic groups including fast-food and fine-dining based on variables such as preparation time, pricing, and presentation. The number of groups within an industry and their composition depends on the dimensions used to define the groups. Strategic management professors and consultants often make use of a two dimensional grid to position firms along an industry's two most important dimensions in order to distinguish direct rivals (those with similar strategies or business models) from indirect rivals. Strategy is the direction and scope of an organization over the long term which achieves advantages for the organization while business model refers to how the firm will generate revenues or make money.

Hunt (1972) coined the term strategic group while conducting an analysis of the appliance industry after he discovered a higher degree of competitive rivalry than suggested by industry concentration ratios. He attributed this to the existence of subgroups within the industry that competed along different dimensions making tacit collusion more difficult. These asymmetrical strategic groups caused the industry to have more rapid innovation, lower prices, higher quality and lower profitability than traditional economic models would predict.

Michael Porter (1980) developed the concept and applied it within his overall system of strategic analysis. He explained strategic groups in terms of what he called "mobility barriers". These are similar to the entry barriers that exist in industries, except they apply to groups within an industry. Because of these mobility barriers a company can get drawn into one strategic group or another. Strategic groups are not to be confused with Porter's generic strategies which are internal strategies and do not reflect the diversity of strategic styles within an industry.

Originally, the analysis of intra-industry variations in the competitive behaviour and performance of firms was based primarily on the use of secondary financial and accounting data. The study of strategic groups from a cognitive perspective, however, has gained prominence during the past years (Hodgkinson 1997).

== Strategic Group Analysis ==
Strategic Group Analysis (SGA) aims to identify organizations with similar strategic characteristics, following similar strategies or competing on similar bases.

Such groups can usually be identified using two or perhaps three sets of characteristics as the bases of competition.

Examples of the SGA:

- Extent of product (or service) diversity.
- Extent of geographic coverage.
- Number of market segments served.
- Distribution channels used.
- Extent of branding.
- Marketing effort.
- Degree of vertical integration.
- Product (or service) quality.
- Pricing policy.

Use of Strategic Group Analysis This analysis is useful in several ways:

- Helps identify who the most direct competitors are and on what basis they compete.
- Raises the question of how likely or possible it is for another organization to move from one strategic group to another.
- Strategic Group mapping might also be used to identify opportunities.
- Can also help identify strategic problems.

Jeannet and Schreuder (2015, pp. 95–99) provide an example how Strategic Group Analysis is used in practice for determining business strategies in a successful multinational firm.

== See also ==
- Strategic management
- Competitor analysis
- List of management topics
