= Brand development index =

The brand development index or BDI quantifies how well a brand performs in a market, compared with its average performance among all markets. That is, it measures the relative sales strength of a brand within a specific market (e.g., the Pepsi brand among 10–50-year-olds).

== Purpose ==
The purpose of the BDI metric is to quantify the relative performance of a brand within specified customer groups. The index helps marketers identify strong and weak segments (usually demographic or geographic) for individual brands.

The BDI is especially useful in conjunction with the category development index (CDI). It can be used in deciding the allocations in the media to which a specific brand is advertised. It can also be used to determine how much advertising, or promotion effort is, or should be put in that specific market.

== Construction ==
BDI: An index of how well a brand performs within a given market group, relative to its performance in the market as a whole.

BDI (I) =
[Brand sales to group (#) ÷ Households in group (#)] ÷
[Total brand sales (#) ÷ Total households (#)]
Note: Although defined here with respect to households, these indexes could also be calculated for customers, accounts, businesses, or other entities.

For example, one might hypothesize that sales per capita of Ben & Jerry's brand ice cream would be greater in the brand's home state, Vermont, than in the rest of the country. By calculating Ben & Jerry's BDIs for Vermont and for the rest of the country, marketers could test this hypothesis quantitatively.

Govoni also defined the BDI as the index of brand sales to category sales, though this ratio is more commonly referred to as market share.

== See also ==
- Philip Kotler et al. Marketing Management, 13th Edition, Prentice Hall, 2009
