= Blindspots analysis =

Blindspots analysis or blind spots analysis is a method aimed at uncovering obsolete, incomplete, or incorrect assumptions in a decision maker’s mental scheme of the environment. Michael Porter used the term "blind spots" to refer to conventional wisdom which no longer holds true, but which still guides business strategy. The concept was further popularized by Barbara Tuchman, in her book The March of Folly (1984), to describe political decisions and strategies which were clearly wrong in their assumptions, and by other authors since, such as social psychologists Mahzarin Banaji and Anthony Greenwald in their study of prejudice.

== Uncovering blind spots ==
Ben Gilad fully developed, in his book, Business Blindspots (1994), the following three-step "Gilad method" for uncovering blind spots

1. Step One: Conducting a Five Forces Analysis on a given industry or segment (market), augmented with identification of possible change drivers, which are defined as trends with the potential to have profound (structural) effect on the balance of power among the five forces.
2. Step Two: Collecting competitive intelligence on the target company’s top executives assumptions regarding the same industry structure as in Step One. Sources may include annual reports' letters to shareholders, autobiographies, interviews in the press, public appearances and speeches, industry meetings, congressional testimonies, conference calls with security analysts (transcripts are publicly available), and all other statements regarding vision and beliefs. An alternative technique is known among competitive intelligence professionals as “strategy’s reverse engineering” which looks for the underlying assumptions which can rationalize existing strategy.
3. Step Three: Compare the results of Step Two with the analysis in Step One. Any contradiction with the analysis in Step One is a potential blindspot.

== Underlying assumptions ==
Underlying Blindspots Analysis is an assumption about the inherent biases of decision making at the top of organizations (business, government or otherwise) exceeding those of their subordinates or outsiders. While many top executives in business and government organizations are smart, capable people, they are also vulnerable to several decision biases that come with their powerful positions, including cognitive dissonance, motivated cognitions, overconfidence, and ego-involvement. The impaired ability of leaders to see reality for what it is, and the more objective (less ego-involved) analysis of analysts and mid-level planners means that Step 3 of the Blindspots Analysis can be a powerful tool for pointing to potential blinders

== See also ==
- Bias blind spot

== Bibliography ==
- Bossidy, Larry (2004). Confronting reality : doing what matters to get things right (1st ed.). New York: Crown Business. ISBN 978-1400050840.
- Cramer, Colin; Loewenstein, George & Prelec, Drazen (March 2005). "Neuroeconomics: How Neuroscience Can Inform Economics". Journal of Economic Literature. XLIII (1): 9–64. doi:10.1257/0022051053737843. S2CID 155893587. In Maital, Shlomo (2007). Recent Developments in Behavioral Economics. UK: Edward Elgar.
- Gilad, Ben (1994). Business Blindspots (First ed.). UK: Irwin-Probus.
- Gilad, Ben (2003). Early Warning. NY: AMACOM.
- Gilad, Ben (2008). "Chapter 3". Business War Games. NJ: Career Press.
- "Money Section: Optimism Puts Rose Colored Tint in Glasses of Top Execs". USA Today. December 16, 2005. p. B1.
