= Market environment =

Business management

Market environment and business environment are marketing terms that refer to factors and forces that affect a firm's ability to build and maintain successful customer relationships. The business environment has been defined as "the totality of physical and social factors that are taken directly into consideration in the decision-making behaviour of individuals in the organisation."

The three levels of the environment are the internal micro environment – the internal elements of the organisation used to create, communicate and deliver market offerings; the external market environment – the external elements which affect the sourcing and distribution process of a product from the supplier to the final consumer; and the external macro environment – larger societal forces that affect the survival of the organisation, including the demographic environment, the political environment, the cultural environment, the natural environment, the technological environment, and the economic environment. The analysis of the macro marketing environment aims to better understand the environment and thus adapt to the social environment to achieve the purpose of enterprise marketing.

== Internal environment ==
The internal environment "consists of those relevant physical and social factors within the boundaries of the organization or specific decision unit that are taken directly into consideration in the decision-making behavior of individuals in that system". This includes all departments such as management, finance, research and development, purchasing, business operations and accounting. Each of these departments influences marketing decisions. For example, research and development has input as to the features a product can perform and accounting approves the financial side of marketing plans and budgets for customer dissatisfaction. Marketing managers must watch supply availability and other trends dealing with suppliers to ensure that the product will be delivered to customers in the time frame required in order to maintain a strong customer relationship. These internal factors can be controlled by the organization to a certain extent. Internal environmental factors are in control of a business organization.

== External environment ==
The external environment includes the "relevant physical and social factors outside the boundaries of the organization or specific decision unit that are taken directly into consideration". The external environment can be further broken into micro and macro environments.

=== Micro environment ===
The micro-environment consists of customers, partners, and competitors. The most important aspect of the micro-environment is the customer market. There are different types of customer markets including consumer markets, business markets, government markets, international markets, and reseller markets. The consumer market is made up of individuals who buy goods and services for their own personal use or use in their household. Business markets include those that buy goods and services for use in producing their own products to sell. This is different from the reseller market which includes non-business activities that purchase goods to resell as is for a profit. These are the same companies mentioned as market intermediaries. The government market consists of government agencies that buy goods to produce public services or transfer goods to others who need them. International markets include buyers in other countries and include customers from the previous categories.

Partners include marketing intermediaries, financiers, and advertising agencies. Marketing intermediaries refer to resellers, physical distribution firms, marketing services agencies, and financial intermediaries. These are the people who help the company promote, sell, and distribute its products to final buyers. Resellers are those who hold and sell the company's product. They match the distribution to the customers and include places such as Wal-Mart, Target, and Best Buy. Physical distribution firms are places such as warehouses that store and transport the company's product from its origin to its destination. Marketing services agencies are companies that offer services such as conducting marketing research, advertising, and consulting. Financial intermediaries are institutions such as banks, credit companies and insurance companies.

Competitors are also a factor in the micro-environment and include companies that offer similar goods and services. To remain competitive, a company must consider who its biggest competitors are while assessing its own size and position within the industry. The company should develop a strategic advantage over its competitors.

The final aspect of the micro-environment is the public, which includes any group that has an interest in, or affects, the organization's ability to meet its goals. For example, the financial public can hinder a company's ability to obtain funds, affecting the level of credit available to the company. The media public includes newspapers and magazines that can publish articles of interest about the company, as well as editorials that may influence customers' opinions. The government public can affect the company by passing legislation and laws that place restrictions on its actions. The citizen-action public includes environmental groups and minority groups that can question a company's actions and bring them into the public spotlight. The local public, including neighborhood and community organizations, may also question a company's impact on the local area and its level of responsibility for its actions. The general public can affect the company because any change in public attitude, whether positive or negative, can cause sales to rise or fall, as the general public often forms the company's customer base. Finally, employees within the company also form part of the public, as they are involved in the organization and production of the company's products.

=== Macro environment ===
The macro-environment refers to all forces that are part of the larger society and that affect the micro-environment. It encompasses factors such as demography, the economy, natural forces, technology, politics, and culture, among others. The purpose of analyzing the macro marketing environment is to gain a better understanding of the external environment and to adapt to social changes through the enterprise's marketing efforts in order to achieve its marketing objectives.

Factors affecting an organization in the macro environment are known as PESTEL: Political, Economic, Social, Technological, Environmental and Legal.

Demography refers to the study of human populations in terms of size, density, location, age, gender, race, and occupation. This helps marketers to divide the population into market segments and target markets. An example of demography is classifying groups of people according to the year they were born. These classifications include baby boomers, who are born between 1946 and 1964, Generation X, who are born between 1965 and 1980, millennials, who are born between 1981 and 1996, and Generation Z (also known as zoomers), who are born between 1997 and 2012. Each classification has different characteristics and causes they find important. This can be beneficial to a marketer as they can decide who their product would benefit the most and tailor their marketing plan to attract that segment. Demography covers many aspects that are important to marketers including family dynamics, geographic shifts, workforce changes, and levels of diversity in any given area.

Another aspect of the macro-environment is the economic environment. This refers to the purchasing power of potential customers and the ways in which people spend their money. Within this area are two different economies: subsistence and industrialized. Subsistence economies are based more on agriculture and consume their own industrial output. Industrial economies have markets that are diverse and carry many different types of goods. Each is important to the marketer because each has a highly different spending pattern as well as a different distribution of wealth.

The natural environment is another important factor of the macro-environment. This includes the natural resources that a company uses as inputs that affect its marketing activities. The concern in this area is the increased pollution, shortages of raw materials and increased governmental intervention. As raw materials become increasingly scarce, the ability to create a company's product gets much harder. Also, pollution can go as far as negatively affecting a company's reputation if they are known for damaging the environment. The last concern, government intervention can make it increasingly harder for a company to fulfill its goals as requirements get more stringent.

The technological environment is a rapidly evolving component of the macro-environment. This includes all developments from antibiotics and surgery to automobiles and credit cards. The development of these markets can create new markets and give new uses to products. It also requires a company to stay ahead of competitors and update its own technology as it becomes outdated. Companies that fail to adapt risk losing competitive position.

To understand different spending patterns, marketers also take into consideration the development of digital technology and its effect on market growth and employment. It is key for a marketer, especially in a digitally dominated market, to anticipate demand in order to capitalize on potential market growth. Technology has developed to the extent where purchase patterns can be analysed in order to forecast future demand.

The political environment includes all laws, government agencies, and groups that influence or limit other organizations and individuals within a society. Marketers need to be aware of these restrictions as they can be complex. Some products are regulated by both state and federal laws. There are even restrictions for some products as to who the target market may be; for example, cigarettes should not be marketed to younger children. There are also many restrictions on subliminal messages and monopolies. As laws and regulations often change, it is important for marketers to monitor. As laws and regulations often change, they create barriers that can influence the way in which companies can market their business across the digital community in particular. When conducting business in the United Kingdom, the government is committed to ensuring the best possible platform to start and grow a UK digital business, therefore Internet Governance becomes a vital force in the management and control of the growth of the internet and its usage.

The final aspect of the macro-environment is the social environment, which consists of institutions and basic values and beliefs of a group of people. These values can also be further categorized into core beliefs, which are passed on from generation to generation and are very difficult to change, and secondary beliefs, which tend to be easier to influence. As a marketer, it is important to know the difference between the two and to focus your marketing campaign to reflect the values of a target audience. With the influence of digital technology in the formation of social beliefs and values, cultural diversity has developed within the world of digital communities on platforms such as Facebook, Twitter and LinkedIn. These digital communities consist of many groups of demographics that involve different levels of Internet usage and versatile behaviour with online purchasing.

There are a number of common approaches for identifying and examining the external factors describing the macro environment. These factors indirectly affect the organization but cannot be controlled by it. One such approach is PEST (political, economic, social and technological) analysis. Other analysis variations include environmental and legal factors. A second approach is to use a SWOT (Strength, Weakness, Opportunity and Threat) analysis.

=== Meso environment ===
The meso-level is settled between the macro- and the micro- level. This field deals with the design of the specific environment of the enterprises. It is of decisive importance that the layout of the physical infrastructure (transport, communication and power distribution systems) and of the sector policies, especially of the education, research and technology policy, are oriented towards competitiveness. In addition, the design of the trade policy and systems of rules (for example, environmental norms and technical safety standards), which contribute to the development of national advantages of competition, is relevant. Like on the micro-level, on the meso-level new patterns of organisation and steering must be developed. The state shall give impulses and mediate between enterprises, associations, science and intermediate institutions. "The design of locations becomes like that a continuous process on the basis of the efforts of enterprises, science and state as well as of the determined cooperation of private and public agents".

== Environmental scanning ==
Environmental scanning is one of the essential components of the global environmental analysis. Environmental monitoring, environmental forecasting and environmental assessment complete the global environmental analysis. The global environment refers to the macro environment which comprises industries, international markets, companies, clients and competitors. Consequently, there exist corresponding analyses on the micro-level. Suppliers, customers and competitors representing the micro environment of a company are analyzed within the industry analysis. Older sources suggest environmental scanning as an alternative name for horizon scanning (HS), whereby newer sources rather see environmental scanning along with trend monitoring, trend research and strategic early warning as predecessors for HS.

Environmental scanning can be defined as 'the study and interpretation of the political, economic, social and technological events and trends which influence a business, an industry or even a total market'.

The factors which need to be considered for environmental scanning are events, trends, issues and expectations of the different interest groups. Issues are often forerunners of trend breaks. A trend break could be a value shift in society, a technological innovation that might be permanent or a paradigm change. Issues are less deep-seated and can be 'a temporary short-lived reaction to a social phenomenon'. A trend can be defined as an 'environmental phenomenon that has adopted a structural character'.

Environmental scanning is an ongoing process and organizations are always refining the way their particular company or business goes through the process. Environmental scanning reinforces productive strategic plans and policies that can be implemented to make the organization get the maximum use of the business environment they are in. Environmental scanning not only helps the business find its strengths in its current environment but it also finds the weaknesses of competitors, identifies new markets, potential customers and up-and-coming technological platforms and devices that can be best used to sell/market the product or service. Environmental scanning helps a business improve their decision-making process in times of risk to the external and internal environments the business is in.

=== Process ===
When scanning the environment, the organization needs to look at all the influences on the company. The scanning process makes the organization aware of what the business environment is about. It allows the organization to adapt and learn from that environment. When the company responds to an environmental scanning process, it allows them to easily respond and react to any changes to both the internal and external business environment. Environmental scanning is a useful tool for strategic management as it helps them to create and develop the aims and objectives of the company, which assists with the production of the company or organization.

When looking at the weaknesses of the organization's placement in the current business environment a formal environmental scanning is used. A common formal environmental scanning process has five steps. The five steps are fundamental in the achievement of each step and may develop each other in some form:

1. The first step of the environmental scanning process requires the identification of the needs and the issues that have occurred that caused the organization to decide that an environmental scan is required. Before starting the process there are several factors that need to be considered which include the purpose of the scanning, who will be participating in the process, and the amount of time and resources that will be allocated for the duration of the scanning process.
2. The second step of the scanning process is gathering the information. All the needs of the organization are translated into required pieces of information that will be useful in the process.
3. The third step is analyzing all the information that the business has collected. When analyzing the information organizations become aware of the trends or issues that may influence them.
4. Step four of the environmental scanning process is all about the communication of the results obtained in step three. The appropriate decision makers analyze the translated information about the potential effects on the organization. All the information is presented in a simple and concise format
5. Step five is all about making informed decisions. Management creates appropriate steps that will position the organization in the current business environment.

=== Information sources used ===
The sources used for market learning can be split into two categories: external and internal information sources. The external sources can emerge from market research or from verbal communication such as 'word of mouth'. Other examples of external information sources include personal contacts, customers, and commercial databases. Internal information comes from within the organization. Some examples of internal information include internal reports, sales staff, internal databases and memoranda from committees and meetings.

=== Barriers ===
Environmental scanning is not always as effective or useful in an organizational setting for several reasons. The volume of the information received through the scanning process can be disadvantageous when attempting to translate and make sense of the information as some information may get overlooked or just missed entirely. Because of the volume of information, it is hard to decipher what is important, so management and key information may be missed. Another way vital information can be missed is if the information is unordered and unorganized. Due to an ever-changing environment all information runs under a time limit of validity. Another barrier to environment scanning is the interpretation of information that has been collected. Undetermined sources can cause confusion and irrelevance to the process. Current research shows that the analysis of the market environment has challenges in predicting or foreseeing upcoming market changes. The reason is that market scanning frameworks often suggest observing a broad range of categories without offering detailed guidelines for what aspects to emphasize or ignore. In consequence, even firms that scan their market environment continuously get blindsided by disruptions.
