= James Mark Baldwin =

American philosopher and psychologist (1861–1934)

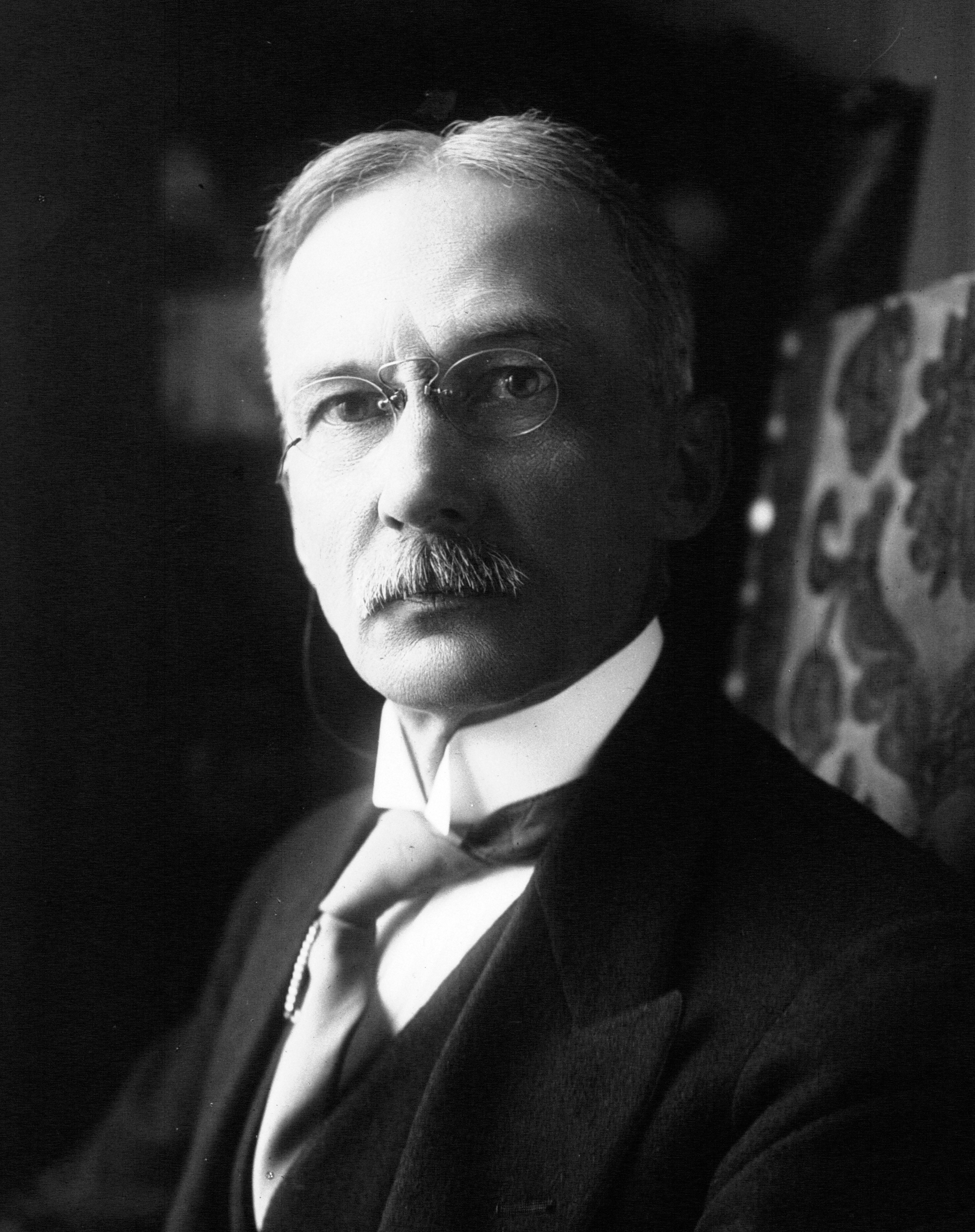
James Mark Baldwin in 1917

James Mark Baldwin (January 12, 1861 – November 8, 1934) was an American philosopher and psychologist who was educated at Princeton under the supervision of Scottish philosopher James McCosh and who was one of the founders of the Department of Psychology at Princeton and the University of Toronto. He made important contributions to early psychology, psychiatry, and the theory of evolution, for example, evolutionary biology's Baldwin effect was named after him.

== Biography ==
=== Early life ===
Baldwin was born on January 12, 1861 and raised in Columbia, South Carolina. His father, who was from Connecticut, was an abolitionist and was known to purchase slaves in order to free them. During the Civil War his father moved north, but the family remained in their home until the time of Sherman's March. Upon their return after the war, Baldwin's father was part of the Reconstruction Era government. Baldwin was sent north to receive his secondary education in New Jersey. As a result, he chose to attend the College of New Jersey (now Princeton University).

Baldwin started in theology under the tutelage of the college's president, James McCosh, but soon switched to philosophy, completing a A.B. in 1884. He was awarded the Green Fellowship in Mental Science (named after his future father-in-law, the head of the Princeton Theological Seminary) and used it to study in Germany with Wilhelm Wundt at Leipzig and with Friedrich Paulsen at Berlin during the following year.

In 1886 he became Instructor in French and German at the Princeton Theological Seminary. He translated Théodule-Armand Ribot's German Psychology of Today and wrote his first paper "The Postulates of a Physiological Psychology". Ribot's work traced the origins of psychology from Immanuel Kant through Johann Friedrich Herbart, Gustav Theodor Fechner, Hermann Lotze to Wundt.

In 1887, while working as a professor of philosophy at Lake Forest College, he married Helen Hayes Green, the daughter of the president of the seminary, William Henry Green. At Lake Forest, he published the first part of his Handbook of Psychology (Senses and Intellect) in which he directed attention to the new experimental psychology of Ernst Heinrich Weber, Fechner and Wundt. He also completed his master's degree from Princeton. In 1889, he completed his doctoral degree, also from Princeton.

In 1890 he went to the University of Toronto as the Chair of Logic and Metaphysics. His creation of a laboratory of experimental psychology at Toronto (which he claimed was the first in the British Empire) coincided with the birth of his daughters Helen (1889) and Elizabeth (1891) which inspired the quantitative and experimental research on infant development that was to make such a vivid impression on Jean Piaget and Lawrence Kohlberg through Baldwin's Mental Development in the Child and the Race: Methods and Processes (1894) dedicated to the subject. A second part of Handbook of Psychology (Feeling and Will) appeared in 1891.

During this creative phase Baldwin traveled to France (1892) to visit the important psychologists Jean-Martin Charcot (at the Salpêtrière), Hippolyte Bernheim (at Nancy), and Pierre Janet.

=== Mid-career ===
In 1893 he was called back to his alma mater, Princeton University, where he was offered the Stuart Chair in Psychology and the opportunity to establish a new psychology laboratory. He would stay at Princeton until 1903 working out the highlights of his career reflected in Social and Ethical Interpretations in Mental Development: A Study in Social Psychology (1897) where he took his previous Mental Development to the critical stage in which it survived in the work of Lev Vygotsky, through Vygotsky in the crucial work of Alexander Luria, and in the synthesis of both by Aleksey Leontyev. He also edited the English editions of Karl Groos's Play of Animals (1898) and Play of Men (1901).

It was during this time that Baldwin wrote "A New Factor in Evolution" (June 1896/The American Naturalist) which later became known as the "Baldwin Effect". But other important contributors should not be overlooked. Conwy Lloyd Morgan was perhaps closest to understanding the so-called "Baldwin Effect". In his Habit and Instinct (1896) he phrased a comparable version of the theory, as he did in an address to a session of the New York Academy of Sciences (February 1896) in the presence of Baldwin. (1896/"Of modification and variation". Science 4(99) (November 20):733-739). As did Henry Fairfield Osborn (1896/"A mode of evolution requiring neither natural selection nor the inheritance of acquired characteristics". Transactions of the New York Academy of Science 15:141-148). The "Baldwin Effect", building in part on the principle of "organic selection" proposed by Baldwin in "Mental Development" did only receive its name from George Gaylord Simpson in 1953. (in: Evolution 7:110-117) (see: David J. Depew in "Evolution and Learning" M.I.T. 2003)

Baldwin complemented his psychological work with philosophy, in particular epistemology his contribution to which he presented in the presidential address to the American Psychological Association in 1897. By then the work on the Dictionary of Philosophy and Psychology (1902) had been announced and a period of intense philosophical correspondence ensued with the contributors to the project: William James, John Dewey, Charles Sanders Peirce, Josiah Royce, George Edward Moore, Bernard Bosanquet, James McKeen Cattell, Edward B. Titchener, Hugo Münsterberg, Christine Ladd-Franklin, Adolf Meyer, George Stout, Franklin Henry Giddings, Edward Bagnall Poulton and others.

In 1897, Baldwin was also elected to the American Philosophical Society.

In 1899 Baldwin went to Oxford to supervise the completion of the Dictionary... (1902). He was awarded an Honorary Doctorate in Science at Oxford University. (In the light of the foregoing, the deafening silence with which J. M. Baldwin was later treated in Oxford publications on the mind may well come to be regarded as one of the significant omissions in the history of ideas for the 20th century. Compare for example Richard Gregory: The Oxford Companion to the Mind, first edition, 1987.)

=== Later life ===
In 1903, partly as a result of a dispute with Princeton president Woodrow Wilson and in part due to an offer involving more pay and less teaching, he moved to a professorship of philosophy and psychology at Johns Hopkins University. Here, he re-opened the experimental laboratory that had been founded by G. Stanley Hall in 1884 (but had closed with Hall's departure to take over the presidency of Clark University in 1888).

In Baltimore Baldwin started to work on Thoughts and Things: A Study of the Development and Meaning of Thought, Or Genetic Logic (1906), a densely integrative rendering of his ideas culminating in Genetic Theory of Reality: Being the Outcome of Genetic Logic as Issuing in the Aesthetic Theory of Reality called Pancalism (1915). This book introduced the concept that knowledge grows through childhood in a series of distinct stages that involve interaction between innate abilities and environmental feedback, a proposal that was taken back by Piaget. He further stated that the initial physical development gives way to language and cognitive abilities such that the child emerges as a result of social and physical growth.

In Baltimore also Baldwin was arrested in a raid on a "colored" brothel (1908), a scandal that put an end to his American career. Forced to leave Johns Hopkins, he looked for residence in Paris. He was to reside in France till his death in 1934.

His first years (1908–1912) in France were interrupted by long stays in Mexico where he advised on university matters and lectured at the School of Higher Studies at the National University in Mexico City. His Darwin and the Humanities (1909) and Individual and Society (1911) date from this period. In 1912 he took permanent residence in Paris.

Baldwin's residence in France resulted in his pointing out the urgency of American non-neutral support for his new hosts on the French battlefields of World War I. He published American Neutrality, Its Cause and Cure (1916) for the purpose, and when in 1916 he survived a German torpedo attack on the Sussex in the English Channel – on the return trip from a visit to William Osler at Oxford – his open telegram to the president of the United States on the affair became frontpage news (New York Times). With the entry of America in the war (1917) he helped to organize the Paris branch of the American Navy League, acting as its Chairman till 1922. In 1926 his memoirs Between Two Wars (1861-1921) were published. He died in Paris on November 8, 1934.

== Ideas ==
Baldwin was prominent among early experimental psychologists and was voted by his peers as the fifth most important psychologist in America in a 1903 survey conducted by James McKeen Cattell, but it was his contributions to developmental psychology that were the most important. His stepwise theory of cognitive development was a major influence on the later, and much more widely known, developmental theory of Jean Piaget. His ideas on the relationship of Ego and Alter were developed by Pierre Janet; while his stress on how "My sense of self grows by imitation of you...an imitative creation" contributed to the mirror stage of Jacques Lacan.

His contributions to the young discipline's early journals and institutions were highly significant as well. Baldwin was a co-founder (with James McKeen Cattell) of Psychological Review (which was founded explicitly to compete with G. Stanley Hall's American Journal of Psychology), Psychological Monographs and Psychological Index. He was also the founding editor of Psychological Bulletin.

In 1892 he was vice-president of the International Congress of Psychology held in London, and in 1897–1898 president of the American Psychological Association; he received a gold medal from the Royal Academy of Arts and Sciences of Denmark (1897), and was honorary president of the International Congress of Criminal Anthropology held in Geneva in 1896.

=== Organic selection ===
The idea of organic selection came from the interpretation of the observable data in Baldwin's experimental study of infant reaching and its role in mental development. Every practice of the infant's movement intended to advance the integration of behavior favorable to development in the experimental framework appeared to be selected from an excess of movement in the trial of imitation.

In further stages of development – the ones most critical to an understanding of the evolution of mind – this was graphically illustrated in the child's efforts to draw and learning to write. (Mental Development in the Child and the Race)

In later editions of Mental Development Baldwin changed the term "organic selection" into "functional selection".

So, from the outset the idea was well linked to the philosophy of mind Baldwin was emancipating from the models inspired by divine pre-establishment. (Spinoza) (Wozniak, 2001)

It is the communication of this insight into the practice-related nature of dynamogenic development, above all its integration as a creative factor in the fabric of society, that helped the students of Baldwin to understand what was left of Lamarck's signature. Singularly illustrated by Gregory Bateson in Mind and Nature (1979) and reintegrated in contemporary studies by Terrence Deacon (The Symbolic Species: The co-evolution of language and the human brain, 1997) and other scholars of biosemiotics.

In the human species the faculty of niche building is favored by a practical intelligence able to design the circumstances that will put its vital acquirements out of harm's way in terms of (linearly predicted) natural selection. It is precisely in the fields of study relating to massive selection pressures against which other species seem to be without defenses – biological development in the face of novel pandemics (AIDS, mad cow disease) – that the arguments relative to the natural heredity of intelligent acquirements have resurfaced in a way most challenging to science.

=== Baldwin effect ===
Baldwin's most important theoretical legacy is the concept of the Baldwin effect or "Baldwinian evolution". Baldwin proposed, against the neo-Lamarckians of his day (most notably Edward Drinker Cope), that there is a mechanism whereby epigenetic factors come to shape the congenital endowment as much as – or more than – natural selection pressures. In particular, human behavioral decisions made and sustained across generations as a set of cultural practices ought to be considered among the factors shaping the human genome.

For example, the incest taboo, if powerfully enforced, removes the natural selection pressure against the possession of incest-favoring instincts. After a few generations without this natural selection pressure, unless such genetic material were profoundly fixed, it would tend to diversify and lose its function. Humans would no longer be innately averse to incest, but would rely on their capacity to internalize such rules from cultural practices.

The opposite case can also be true: cultural practice might selectively breed humans to meet the fitness conditions of new environments, cultural and physical, which earlier hominids could not have survived. Baldwinian evolution might strengthen or weaken a genetic trait.

== Influence ==
Baldwin's contribution to this field places him at the heart of contemporary controversies in the fields of evolutionary psychology and wider sociobiology. Few people did more than Robert Wozniak, Professor of Psychology at Bryn Mawr College, for the rediscovery of the significance of James Mark Baldwin in the history of ideas.

== Work ==
Apart from articles in the Psychological Review, Baldwin wrote:

- Handbook of Psychology (1890), translation of Ribot's German Psychology of To-day (1886);
- Elements of Psychology (1893);
- Social and Ethical Interpretations in Mental Development (1898);
- Story of the Mind (1898);
- Mental Development in the Child and the Race (1896);
- Thought and Things (London and New York, 1906).

He also largely contributed to the Dictionary of Philosophy and Psychology (1901–1905), of which he was editor in-chief.

To view volumes of Baldwin's Dictionary of Philosophy and Psychology at online archives:
Online
browse
Link
by
Save
Vol. I
(A-Laws)
Vol. II
(Le-Z)
Vol. III (bibliog.)

part I
part II
Internet Archive
Flipbook, DjVu,
DjVu's plaintext
Book
pdf, DjVu, &
.txt file
All 3 volumes (but some hard to read)
Google Book Search Beta
(editions may not yet be fully
accessible outside USA.)
Images &
plaintext
Page
pdf &
.txt file
Vol. I
Vol. II
Vol. III,
part I
Vol. III,
part II
All results
(not distinctly
labeled)
The Virtual Laboratory
Images
Page,
Entry
pdf (desired
pages)
All 3 volumes
Browse A-Z by headwords in Vols. I & II
Classics in the History of Psychology
html
Letter/
Entry
html

A-O from Vols. I & II, transcribing

== See also ==
- George Herbert Mead
- Life history theory
- Orthogenesis
- Epigenetics
- Pangenesis
- Weismann Barrier
- Evolutionary developmental biology
