= Intend =

Intend, and its variations, may refer to:

- Intendant, the holder of a public administrative office in several countries
- Intended, a person engaged or betrothed to be married
- Intended reader, a member of a target audience
- Intending cross or memorial cross to commemorate an event

== See also ==
- Intent (disambiguation)
