= Intention (disambiguation) =

An intention is a mental state committing to a course of action.

Intention may also refer to:

- "Intention", a 1957 monograph by philosopher G. E. M. Anscombe
- Intention (criminal law), a state of mind accompanying certain crimes
  - Intention in English law
- Intention (film), a 2018 Korean documentary on the sinking of MV Sewol
- "Intention" (Intelligent Music Project song), Bulgaria's entry in the Eurovision Song Contest 2022
- "Intention" (Kenichi Suzumura song), a 2008 single
- Intention Nunataks, a group of peaks in Antarctica

== See also ==
- Intent (disambiguation)
- Intentions (disambiguation)
- Intentional Theatre, a community theater in Waterford, Connecticut
- Intension
