= Intent (disambiguation) =

Intent is an individual's purpose in performing an action.

Intent may also refer to:

== Computing and technology ==
- Intent (Android), an abstract description of an operation to be performed in the Android development environment
- Intent (software), Tao Group's software platform

== Other uses ==
- Original intent, a theory of legal interpretation
- Intent (military), a capability in military doctrine

== See also ==
- Goal (disambiguation)
- Intend (disambiguation)
- Intention (disambiguation)
- Mens rea
- Objective (disambiguation)
- Purpose (disambiguation)
