= Autogenesis =

Autogenesis may refer to:

- Abiogenesis, the origination of life from non-living things, as believed by Aristotle and in modern evolutionary theory
- Orthogenesis, a discredited evolutionary idea that hypothesised a directed teleological form of evolution
- "Christ the Autogenes" in gnostic texts such as the Secret Book of John
- Autogeny, the reproductive strategy in insects in which the bodily food reserves of an adult female will support reproduction without feeding, particularly without a blood meal before oviposition
- The highest stage in the development of complex adaptive systems in Viable System Theory
- Autogenesis, a proposed kind of thermodynamic synergy that the first living creature may have possessed

Autogenous may refer to:

- Autogenous tissue in surgical autotransplantation (tissue transplanted from elsewhere in an individual's own body)
- Autogenous weld, using no filler metal
- Autogenous grinding mill, in which ore grinds itself through tumbling impacts
- Autogenous models for the origins of cellular features, such as membrane-bound organelles or flagella
- Autogenous pyrometallurgy, in which the feedstock contains enough combustible material to fuel its own heating
- Autogenous training, a psychological technique for guiding one's own thoughts, feelings, or behaviors

Autogenic may refer to:

- Autogenic training, a desensitization-relaxation technique to alleviate stress
- Autogenic succession, ecological change driven by the organisms present in an environment
- Autogenic inhibition reflex, by which a muscle under high tension relaxes itself to avoid injury
