= Intentions (disambiguation) =

Intentions are a mental state that represents a commitment to carrying out actions in the future.

Intentions may also refer to:

- "Intentions" (Gorgon City song), 2013
- "Intentions" (Justin Bieber song), 2020
- "Intentions" (Macklemore song), 2017
- "Intentions", a 2025 song by Twenty One Pilots from Breach
- "Intentions (22)", a 2019 song by Ziggy Alberts

== See also ==
- Intent (disambiguation)
- Intention (disambiguation)
