= Entention =

Neologism similar to Intention

- Origin/etymology: Incomplete Nature
- Meaning: An adjective that applies to the class of objects and phenomena that refer to or are in some other way "about" something not present
- Coined by: Terrence Deacon

Entention is a neologism coined by biological anthropologist Terrence Deacon in his 2011 book Incomplete Nature. The term is deliberately similar to the term intention, which has a long history of use in philosophy of mind, but was designed to have a broader scope. "Ententional" is an adjective that applies to the class of objects and phenomena that refer to or are in some other way "about" something not present. This Wikipedia page is ententional because it refers to and is explicitly about an abstract concept which is not physically present in the page itself. Other paradigm examples of ententional objects are books, DNA strands, and tools. In contrast, rocks, stars, and electromagnetic radiation are not ententional.

Jeremy Sherman writes on ententionality, "Deacon coins the term 'ententional,' to encompass the entire range of phenomena that must be explained, everything from the first evolvable function, to human social processes, everything traditionally called intentional but also everything merely functional, fitting and therefore representing its environment with normative (good or bad fit) consequences."
