= Tao Group =

Tao Group may refer to one of two companies:

- Tao Group Hospitality, a restaurant and nightclub operator
- Tao Group (software), a defunct British software firm
