= Reader model =

A reader model is the term used for the hypothetical average person who is the target audience for a product. A reader model can be made from the average behaviour of many product users by datamining things like loyalty cards. Based on data collected from datamining, an 'ordinary individual' (everyman) can be constructed (modeled) to develop the best strategy for selling to consumers. Reader models are used by corporations to direct consumer behaviour to their products. Marketing, advertising, and product placement use reader models as a central part of their planning and source the reader model by using focus groups. In plain language a reader model is used by corporations to predict who will buy the better mousetrap. The 'everyman' is used by commercial musicians, writers, and the movie industry trying to make money from a product that will appeal to a mass audience. These industries use the reader model to try to gauge and predict the consumer market in an effort to create and profit from a hit single, best seller, or a box office hit movie. A well-known example is the success of Jaws (novel), the film, and the theme music.

== See also ==
- Context
- Dialectic
- Discourse
- Form of address
- Frame of reference
- Grammatical person
- Hermeneutics
- In medias res
- Narrative hook
- Paradigm
- Perspective (cognitive)
- Point of view (literature)
- Pragmatics
- Reality tunnel
- Rhetoric
- Semeiotic
- Semiotics
- Sign relation
- Umwelt
- Universal pragmatics
- Weltanschauung
