= Terrence Deacon =

American linguist

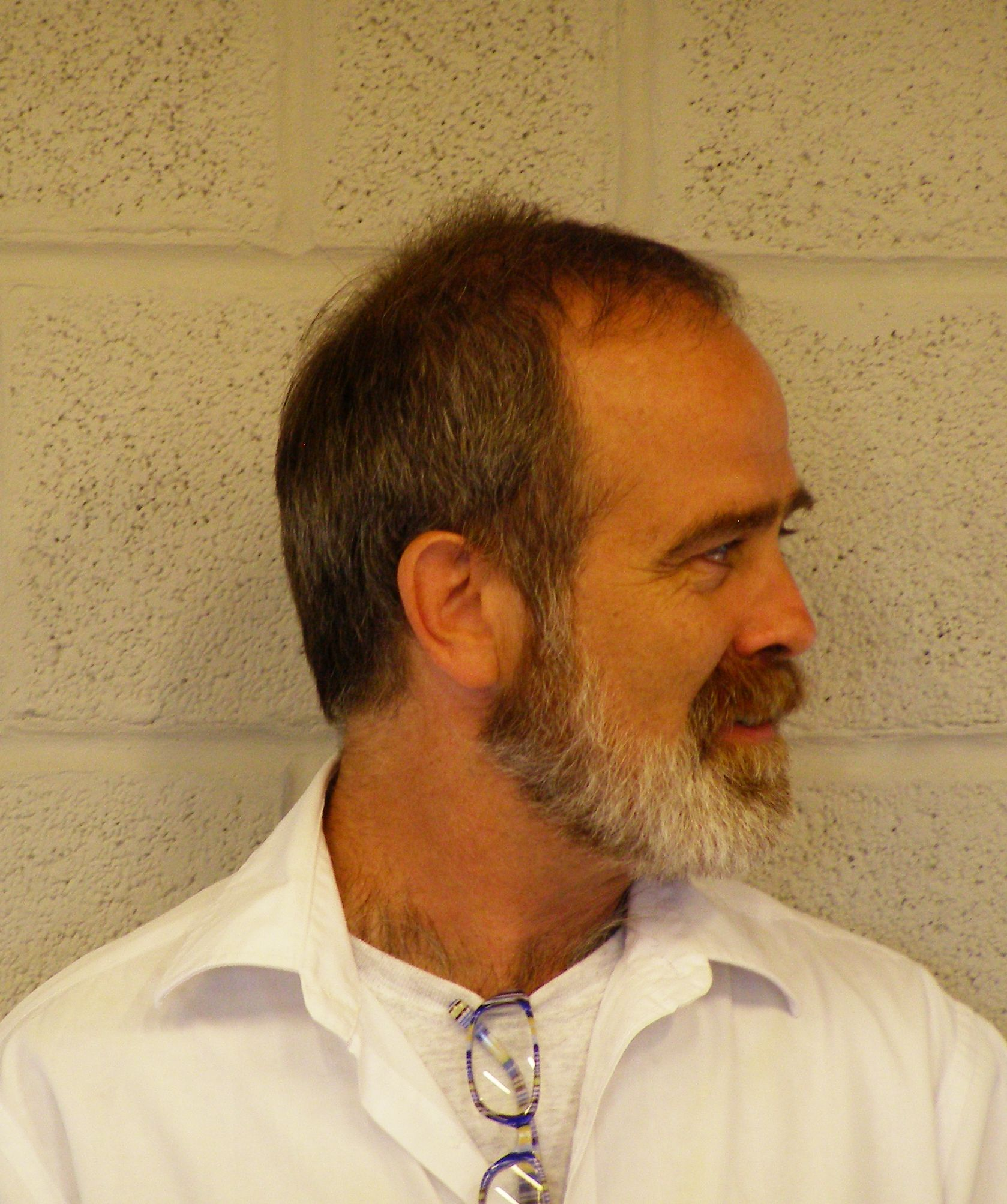
- Terrence Deacon in 2008
- Born: Terrence William Deacon; 1950 (age 75–76)
- Education: Western Washington University; Harvard University
- Scientific career
- Fields: Neuroanthropology
- Workplaces: Harvard University; Boston University; University of California, Berkeley
- Doctoral advisor: Irven DeVore

Terrence William Deacon (born 1950) is an American neuroanthropologist (Ph.D. in Biological Anthropology, Harvard University 1984). He taught at Harvard for eight years, relocated to Boston University in 1992, and is currently Professor of Anthropology and member of the Cognitive Science Faculty at the University of California, Berkeley.

== Theoretical interests ==
Deacon's theoretical interests include the study of evolution-like processes at multiple levels, including their role in embryonic development, neural signal processing, language change, social processes, and focusing especially on how these different processes interact and depend on each other. He has long stated an interest in developing a scientific semiotics (particularly biosemiotics) that would contribute to both linguistic theory and cognitive neuroscience.

== Fields of research ==
Deacon's research combines human evolutionary biology and neuroscience, with the aim of investigating the evolution of human cognition. His work extends from laboratory-based cellular-molecular neurobiology to the study of semiotic processes underlying animal and human communication, especially language and language origins. His neurobiological research is focused on determining the nature of the human divergence from typical primate brain anatomy, the cellular-molecular mechanisms producing this difference, and the correlations between these anatomical differences and special human cognitive abilities, again, particularly language.

== Work ==
His 1997 book, The Symbolic Species: The Co-evolution of Language and the Brain is widely considered a seminal work in the subject of evolutionary cognition. His approach to semiotics, thoroughly described in the book, is fueled by a career-long interest in the ideas of the late 19th-century American philosopher, Charles Sanders Peirce. In it, he uses the metaphors of parasite and host to describe language and the brain, respectively, arguing that the structures of language have co-evolved to adapt to their brain hosts.

His 2011 book, Incomplete Nature: How Mind Emerged from Matter, explores the properties of life, the emergence of consciousness, and the relationship between evolutionary and semiotic processes. The book speculates on how properties such as information, value, purpose, meaning, and end-directed behavior emerged from physics and chemistry. Critics of the book argue that Deacon has drawn heavily from the works of Alicia Juarrero and Evan Thompson without providing full citations or references, but a UC Berkeley investigation exonerated Deacon.

In contrast to the arguments presented by Juarrero in Dynamics in Action (1999, MIT Press) and by Thompson in Mind in Life (2007, Belknap Press and Harvard University Press), Deacon explicitly rejects claims that living or mental phenomena can be explained by dynamical systems approaches. Instead, Deacon argues that life- or mind-like properties only emerge from a higher-order reciprocal relationship between self-organizing processes.

== Bibliography ==
=== Books ===
- The Symbolic Species: The Co-evolution of Language and the Brain. New York: W.W. Norton & Company. 1997. ISBN 978-0-393-31754-1
- Incomplete Nature: How Mind Emerged from Matter. New York: W.W. Norton & Company. 2011. ISBN 978-0-393-04991-6

=== Articles and essays ===
- Deacon, T.W. (1989). "Holism and associationism in neuropsychology: an anatomical synthesis." in E. Perecman (Ed.), Integrating Theory and Practice in Clinical Neuropsychology. Erlbaum. Hilsdale, NJ. 1-47.
- Deacon, T.W. (1990). "Rethinking mammalian brain evolution." Am Zool. 30:629–705.
- Deacon, T.W. (1997). "What makes the human brain different?" Annu. Rev. Anthropol. 26: 337-57.
- Deacon, T.W. (2001). "Heterochrony in brain evolution." In Parker et al. (eds.), Biology, Brains, and Behavior. SAR Press, pp. 41–88.
- Deacon, T.W. (2006). "Emergence: The Hole at the Wheel’s Hub." Chapter 5 in P. Clayton & P. Davies (Eds.), The Re-Emergence of Emergence: The Emergentist Hypothesis from Science to Religion. Oxford University Press, pp. 111–150.
- Deacon, T.W. (2006). "Reciprocal linkage between self-organizing processes is sufficient for self-reproduction and evolvability." Biological Theory 1(2):136-149.
- Deacon, T.W. (2007). "Shannon-Boltzmann-Darwin: Redefining Information. Part 1." Cognitive Semiotics 1:123-148.
- Deacon, T.W. (2008). "Shannon-Boltzmann-Darwin: Redefining Information. Part 2." Cognitive Semiotics 2:167-194.
- Kull, Kalevi; Deacon, Terrence; Emmeche, Claus; Hoffmeyer, Jesper; Stjernfelt, Frederik. (2009). Theses on biosemiotics: Prolegomena to a theoretical biology. Biological Theory 4(2): 167–173.
- Deacon, T.W. (2010). "A role for relaxed selection in the evolution of the language capacity." PNAS.107:9000-9006.
- Deacon, T.W. (2010). "On the Human: Rethinking the natural selection of human language"

== See also ==
- Entention
