= The Symbolic Species =

1997 book by Terrence Deacon

The Symbolic Species: The Co-evolution of Language and the Brain
- Author: Terrence W. Deacon
- Language: English
- Subject: Language, Co-evolution, Symbolic representation, Human evolution, Genesis of language, Cognition
- Published: 1997 (W.W. Norton & Co)
- Publication place: United States
- Media type: Print
- Pages: 527
- ISBN: 0-393-03838-6
- OCLC: 35025924
- Dewey Decimal: 153.6 20
- LC Class: QP399 .D43 1997

The Symbolic Species is a 1997 book by biological anthropologist Terrence Deacon on the evolution of language. Combining perspectives from neurobiology, evolutionary theory, linguistics, and semiotics, Deacon proposes that language, along with the unique human capacity for symbolic thought, co-evolved with the brain.

The Symbolic Species is a multi-disclipinary book that at the time of publishing was seen as groundbreaking. It is considered to have bound together a wide array of ideas in a way that advanced the understanding of professionals in several fields.

== Symbolic thought and language ==
The reasons for the unique cognitive capacity of humans are explored, along with those for the large number of human activities impossible for animals. The human use of language is said to be responsible for both.

== Co-evolution ==
A chicken-and-egg problem is shown to exist between the emergence of symbolic thought and language: language is said to be the medium of symbolic thought, but it is reasoned that mastery of language would first require the ability to think symbolically. The solution of this chicken-and-egg problem, according to Deacon, is the subtle evolutionary process of co-evolution.
