= Intention =

Mental state denoting commitment to act

An intention is a mental state in which a person commits themselves to a course of action. Having the plan to visit the zoo tomorrow is an example of an intention. The action plan is the content of the intention while the commitment is the attitude towards this content. Other mental states can have action plans as their content, as when one admires a plan, but differ from intentions since they do not involve a practical commitment to realizing this plan. Successful intentions bring about the intended course of action while unsuccessful intentions fail to do so. Intentions, like many other mental states, possess intentionality: they represent possible states of affairs.

Theories of intention try to capture the characteristic features of intentions. The belief–desire theory is the traditionally dominant approach. According to a simple version of it, having an intention is nothing but having a desire to perform a certain action and a belief that one will perform this action. Belief–desire theories are frequently criticized based on the fact that neither beliefs nor desires involve a practical commitment to performing an action, which is often illustrated in various counterexamples. The evaluation theory tries to overcome this problem by explaining intentions in terms of unconditional evaluations. That is to say that intentions do not just present the intended course of action as good in some respect, as is the case for desires, but as good all things considered. This approach has problems in explaining cases of akrasia, i.e. that agents do not always intend what they see as the best course of action. A closely related theory identifies intentions not with unconditional evaluations but with predominant desires. It states that intending to do something consists in desiring it the most. Opponents of this approach have articulated various counterexamples with the goal of showing that intentions do not always coincide with the agent's strongest desire. A different approach to the theories mentioned so far is that of Elizabeth Anscombe, denies the distinction between intentions and actions. On her view, to intend a goal is already a form of acting towards this goal and therefore not a distinct mental state. This account struggles to explain cases in which intentions and actions seem to come apart, as when the agent is not currently doing anything towards realizing their plan or in the case of failed actions. The self-referentiality theory suggests that intentions are self-referential, i.e. that they do not just represent the intended course of action but also represent themselves as the cause of the action. However, the claim that this happens on the level of the content of the intention has been contested.

The term "intention" refers to a group of related phenomena. For this reason, theorists often distinguish various types of intentions in order to avoid misunderstandings. The most-discussed distinction is that between prospective and immediate intentions. Prospective intentions, also known as "prior intentions", involve plans for the future. They can be subdivided according to how far they plan ahead: proximal intentions involve plans for what one wants to do straightaway whereas distal intentions are concerned with a more remote future. Immediate intentions, on the other hand, are intentions that guide the agent while they are performing the action in question. They are also called "intentions-in-action" or "act-related" intentions. The term "intention" usually refers to anticipated means or ends that motivate the agent. But in some cases, it can refer to anticipated side-effects that are neither means nor ends to the agent. In this case, the term "oblique intention" is sometimes used. Intentions are rationally evaluable: they are either rational or irrational. Conscious intentions are the paradigmatic form of intention: in them, the agent is aware of their goals. But it has been suggested that actions can also be guided by unconscious intentions of which the agent is not aware.

The formation of intentions is sometimes preceded by the deliberation of promising alternative courses of action and may happen in decisions, in which the agent chooses between these alternatives. Intentions are responsible for initiating, sustaining, and terminating actions and are frequently used to explain why people engage in a certain behavior. Understanding the behavior of others in terms of intentions already happens in early childhood. Important in this context is the role of gestures, pointing, attention, and eye movement to understand the intentions of others and to form shared intentions. In the philosophy of action, a central question is whether it is true for all intentional actions that they are caused or accompanied by intentions. The theory of reasoned action aims to predict behavior based on how pre-existing attitudes and subjective norms determine behavioral intentions. In ethics, the intention principle states that whether an action is morally permissible sometimes depends on the agent's intention for performing this action.

== Definition ==
Intentions are mental states that involve action plans to which the agent has committed themselves. As action plans, they can guide behavior. The action plan constitutes the content of the intention while the commitment is the agent's attitude towards this content. The term "intention" can be used both for prospective intentions, which are not yet executed, and for the intentions guiding the behavior as it happens, so-called immediate intentions, as discussed below. Intending to study tomorrow is an example of prospective intentions while trying to win a game by scoring a three-point field goal involves an act-related intention.

Folk psychology explains human behavior on the basis of mental states, including beliefs, desires, and intentions. This explanation is based on the idea that desires motivate behavior and beliefs direct the behavior towards the desired goal. This can be understood in terms of causal chains, i.e. that desires cause intentions, intentions cause actions, and actions cause the realization of the desired outcome.

=== Content and commitment ===
Intentions, like various other mental states, can be understood as consisting of two components: a content and an attitude towards this content. On this view, the content of an intention is the action plan in question and the attitude involves a commitment to executing this action. Intentions may share the same content with other mental states, like beliefs and desires. But the different mental states are distinguished from each other concerning their attitudes. Admiring the idea of helping the poor, for example, is different from intending to help the poor, even though both states share the same plan as their content. One difference between desires and intentions is that intentions impose more restrictions on their contents. This includes that intentions are directed at possible courses of action, i.e. that they involve something the agent can do or at least thinks they can do. Desires, on the other hand, do not involve this form of restriction. In this sense, it is possible to desire sunny weather for tomorrow but not to intend sunny weather for tomorrow.

A central aspect of intentions concerning the attitude towards their content is that the agent has committed themselves to the plan in question. This is different from merely wanting to do something and thinking that doing it would be good. It is sometimes argued that this commitment consists in an all-out judgment that the intended course of action is good. On this view, intentions evaluate their intended course of action as good all things considered. This aspect stands in contrast to desires, which evaluate their object merely as good in some sense but leave it open whether it is bad in another sense. Someone who is still deliberating whether to perform a certain action, for example, has not yet committed themselves to performing it and therefore lacks the corresponding intention. It has been argued that this form of commitment or being-settled-on is unique to intentions and is not found in other mental states like beliefs or desires. In this sense, intentions may be based on or accompanied by beliefs and desires but are not reducible to them.

Another important aspect of intentions is that they have conditions of satisfaction, like beliefs and desires. This means that intentions are either successful or unsuccessful. An intention that produces the intended action is a successful intention. But if the produced behavior falls short of its goal, the intention is unsuccessful. The content of the intention determines its conditions of satisfaction. Success is usually not fully up to the agent since various factors outside the agent's control and awareness may influence the success of the attempted action.

=== Intention and intentionality ===
The meaning of the term "intention" is different from the term "intentionality" even though the two are closely related. Intentionality is the more general term: it refers to the power of minds to represent or to stand for things, properties, and states of affairs. Intentions are one form of intentionality since their contents represent possible courses of action. But there are other forms of intentionality, like simple beliefs or perceptions, that do not involve intentions. The adjective "intentional" is ambiguous since it can refer either to intentions or to intentionality.

== Theories of intention ==
Theories of intention try to capture the characteristic features of intentions. Some accounts focus more either on prospective or on immediate intentions while others aim at providing a unified account of these different types of intention.

=== Belief–desire theory ===
The traditionally dominant approach reduces intentions to beliefs and action-desires. An action-desire is a desire to perform an action. On this view, to intend to do sport tomorrow is to have a desire to do sport tomorrow together with a belief that one will do sport tomorrow. Some accounts also hold that this belief is based on the desire: one believes that one will do it because one desires to do it. A similar definition sees intentions as "self-fulfilling expectations that are motivated by a desire for their fulfillment and that represent themselves as such". An important virtue of this approach is its simplicity and its explanatory power. It also manages to account for the fact that there seems to be a close relationship between what one believes, what one desires, and what one intends. But various arguments against this reduction have been presented in the contemporary literature. These often take the form of counterexamples, in which there is both a corresponding belief and a desire without an intention or an intention without one of these components. This is sometimes explained in relation to the idea that intentions involve a form of commitment to or settledness on the intended course of action by the agent. But this aspect is not present in beliefs and desires by themselves. For example, when considering whether to respond to an insult through retaliation, the agent may have both a desire to do so and a belief that they will end up doing this, based on how they acted in the past. But the agent may still lack the corresponding intention since they are not fully decided. It is also possible to have an intention to do something without believing that one actually will do it, for example, because the agent had similar intentions earlier and also failed to act on them back then or because the agent is unsure whether they will succeed. But it has been argued that a weaker relation between intentions and beliefs may be true, e.g. that intentions involve a belief that there is a chance of achieving what one intends.

Another objection focuses on the normative difference between beliefs and intentions. This is relevant for cases where the agent fails to act according to the intended course of action, for example, due to having a weak will. This type of failure is different from the mere epistemic error of incorrectly predicting one's own behavior. But various belief–desire theories are unable to explain this normative difference. Other arguments focus on the dissimilarities between these states. For example, one can desire impossible things but one cannot intend to do what one thinks is impossible. And whereas beliefs can be true or false, this does not apply to intentions.

=== Evaluation theory ===
Another prominent approach, due to Donald Davidson, sees intentions as evaluative attitudes. On his view, desires are conditional evaluative attitudes while intentions are unconditional evaluative attitudes. This means that desires see their object as positive in a certain respect while intentions see their object as positive overall or all things considered. So the agent may have a desire to go to the gym because it is healthy whereas their intention to go to the gym is based on the evaluation that it is good all things considered. This theory is closely related to the belief–desire theory explained above since it also includes the idea that beliefs are involved in intentions. Here the belief in question is not a belief that one will do the action but a belief that the action in question is a means towards the positively evaluated end.

This theory has been criticized based on the idea that there is a difference between evaluating a course of action and committing oneself to a course of action. This difference is important for explaining cases of akrasia, i.e. that people do not always do what they believe would be best to do. An example of akrasia is an author who believes it would be best to work on his new book but ends up watching TV instead, despite his unconditional evaluative attitude in favor of working. In this sense, intentions cannot be unconditional evaluative attitudes since it is possible to intend to do one alternative while having an unconditional evaluative attitude towards another alternative.

=== Strongest-desire theory ===
Another theory focuses exclusively on the relation between intention and desire. It states that intending to do something consists in desiring it the most. The claim that intentions are accompanied by desires is generally accepted. But there are various arguments against the claim that intentions are nothing but desires. They often focus on cases where people intend to do something different from their predominant desire. For example, the agent may intend to go to the gym even though they have a much stronger desire to go to the pub instead. This may be the case because the agent thinks that going to the gym is better even though this is not in tune with their desires. Another counterexample comes from cases where the agent has not yet formed an intention even though one desire is predominant. A closely related theory understands intentions as dispositions to act and desires as dispositions to form intentions, i.e. as higher-order dispositions to act.

=== Intending as doing ===
Most theories of intention see intentions as mental states that are closely related to actions but may occur without the corresponding action in question. Elizabeth Anscombe and her followers provide an alternative account that denies the distinction between intentions and actions. On this view, to intend a goal is already a form of acting towards this goal and therefore not a distinct mental state. This means that when one intends to visit the zoo next Thursday, one is already on the way to doing so. An important strength of this account is that it gives a unified explanation of intentions: it does not need to distinguish between prospective and immediate intentions since all intentions are immediate intentions.

An obvious counterargument to this position is that, in the example of the zoo above, one is not currently doing anything towards realizing this plan. Defenders have rejected this argument by trying to elucidate how even minimal preparatory steps may already be seen as part of the action. Such steps may include, for example, not making any other plans that may interfere with the plan in question, like planning a different appointment at the same time at a different location. Another objection is based on the observation that not all intentions are successful, i.e. that one can intend to do something but fail to do it. For example, one may intend to follow the shortest route home but take a wrong turn and thereby fail to perform the corresponding action. In such cases, it may be argued that the intention was present whereas the action was absent, i.e. the agent intended to take the shortest route but did not take the shortest route. The possibility of the two coming apart would suggest that they are not identical.

=== Self-referentiality theory ===
The self-referentiality theory asserts that one central feature of intentions is that they are self-referential. This means that the intentions do not just represent the intended course of action but also represent themselves as the cause of the action. On this view, the intention to go to the gym represents itself as the cause of going to the gym. One important motivation for accepting a self-referentiality theory is to explain a certain type of case: a case in which the behavior is just like it was intended, but the intention either did not cause the behavior at all or did not cause it in the right way. For example, the agent intends to shoot an intruder, is then startled by a moving shadow, which causes their finger to twitch, thereby shooting the intruder. It is often claimed that in such cases, the behavior in question does not constitute an intentional action, i.e. that the agent did not shoot the intruder intentionally, despite intending to shoot the intruder and shooting the intruder. This paradox can be solved through self-referentiality theories. The behavior in question is not an intentional action because the intention was not properly realized: it was part of the intention to cause the behavior, which did not happen in the right way. It is usually accepted that intentions have to cause the corresponding behavior in the right way for intentional actions to arise. But the claim that this happens on the level of the content of the intention, i.e. that the intention represents itself as causing the behavior, is often contested. Instead, it has been argued that the content of intentions consists only of the corresponding action plan without representing the intention itself and its causal relation to the execution of this plan.

== Types of intentions ==
Some difficulties in understanding intentions are due to various ambiguities and inconsistencies in how the term is used in ordinary language. For this reason, theorists often distinguish various types of intentions in order to avoid misunderstandings and to clearly specify what is being researched.

=== Prospective and immediate ===
An important difference among intentions is that between prospective and immediate intentions. Prospective intentions, also called "prior intentions", are forward-looking: they are plans held by the agent to perform some kind of action in the future. They are different from merely desiring to perform this action since the agent has committed themselves to following them when the time comes. In this sense, it is sometimes held that desires evaluate their object only concerning one specific aspect while the commitments in intentions are based on an all-out evaluation. On this view, the intended course of action is not just evaluated as good in one way but good all things considered. In some cases, the intention may point very far into the future, as when a teenager decides they want to become president one day. In other cases, the formation of the prospective intention only slightly precedes the action, as when the agent intends to scratch their back and does so right away. The commitment to the course of action is reversible. So if the agent encounters good reasons later on for not going through with it, the intention may be dropped or reformulated. In this sense, having a prospective intention to perform a specific action does not ensure that this action will actually be performed later on.

Immediate intentions, also known as "intentions-in-action" or "act-related" intentions, are intentions that guide the agent while they are performing the action in question. They are closely related to the sense of agency. The agent's commitment to the course of action in question consists in their active execution of the plan. But not all forms of human behavior are intentional. Raising one's hand may happen intentionally or unintentionally, for example, when a student wants to signal to the teacher that they have a question in contrast to an involuntary bodily reflex. It is often held that a central aspect of immediate intentions is that the agent knows what they are doing and why they are doing it. This means that the action is accompanied by a certain form of knowledge that is absent in mere purposive behavior. This aspect is sometimes used to contrast the behavior of humans and animals. There is no general agreement that all intentional actions are accompanied by this type of knowledge. One reason to doubt this is that even for intentional actions, the agent is not always able to articulate what they are doing and why they are doing it. Some defenders try to explain this by holding that the corresponding knowledge is there, even if it is not conscious.

==== Proximal and distal ====
Prospective intentions can be categorized by how far they plan ahead. Proximal intentions involve plans for what one wants to do straightaway whereas distal intentions plan further ahead. The same intention can be both proximal and distal if it is directed both at what to do right now and what to do later. For example, deciding to start watching a movie now in one sitting involves an intention that is both proximal and distal. This distinction is important since many courses of action are too complex to be represented at once in full detail. Instead, usually only proximal intentions involve detailed representations while distal intentions may leave their object vague until it becomes more relevant to the task at hand. But distal intentions still play an important role in guiding the formation of proximal intentions. A simple plan to buy batteries at the close by electronics store, for example, involves many steps, like putting on shoes, opening one's door, closing and locking it, going to the traffic light, turning left, etc. These steps are not represented in full detail while the agent is putting on their shoes. Central to this process is the agent's ability to monitor the progress in relation to the proximal intention and to adjust the current behavior accordingly. In this way, intention has the capacity to coordinate the agent's behavior over time. While both proximal and distal intentions are relevant for one's sense of agency, it has been argued that distal intentions lead to a stronger sense of agency.

=== Motivational and oblique ===
The intentional actions performed by agents usually carry a vast number of major or minor consequences with them. The agent is usually unaware of many of them. In relation to these consequences, the agent is acting unintentionally. Other consequences are anticipated by the agent. Some are motivational in that they constitute the agent's reason for performing the action. A third type involves consequences of which the agent is aware but which play no important role for the agent's motivation. These are the objects of oblique intentions: they involve side effects that the agent puts up with in order to realize their main intention. For example, Ted is unaware that smoking causes bladder cancer, but he is aware that it helps him to deal with stress and that it causes lung cancer. His reason for smoking is to deal with stress. Increasing his risk of lung cancer is a side effect he puts up with. So when smoking, Ted unintentionally increases his risk of bladder cancer, his motivational intention is to deal with stress whereas increasing his risk of lung cancer is obliquely intended. Motivational intentions are the paradigmatic form of intentions and are the main focus of the academic literature on intentions.

These distinctions are relevant for morality and the law. Committing a crime unintentionally, for example, is usually seen as a less serious offense than committing the same crime intentionally. This is often referred to as negligence in contrast to having bad intentions. It is usually held that bad consequences intended obliquely carry more weight on a moral level than unintentional bad consequences. There is no consensus whether obliquely intended behavior constitutes an intentional action, e.g. whether it is correct to state that smokers aware of the dangers intentionally damage their health.

=== Rational and irrational ===
Intentions are rationally evaluable: they are either rational or irrational. In this sense, they stand in contrast to arational mental states, like urges or experiences of dizziness, which are outside the domain of rationality. Various criteria for the rationality of intentions have been proposed. Some hold that intentions are based on desires and beliefs and that, therefore, their rationality depends on these desires and beliefs. On this view, desires present certain goals, beliefs present the means needed to achieve these goals and intentions constitute commitments to realize the means towards these goals. In this sense, an intention that is based on irrational states is itself irrational. For example, the intention to heal oneself through the power of crystals is irrational if it is based on an irrational belief concerning the healing power of crystals. But irrationality can also arise if two intentions are not consistent with each other, i.e. if the agent intends both to perform one action and to perform another action while believing that these two actions are incompatible with each other. A closely related form of irrationality applies to the relation between means and ends. This so-called principle of means-end coherence holds that it is irrational to intend to perform one action without intending to perform another action while believing that this latter action is necessary to achieve the former action. For example, it would be irrational to intend to become healthy if the agent believes that exercising is necessary to become healthy but is unwilling to exercise. In such a case, it may still be rational for the agent to desire to become healthy, but intending it is not. This principle is expressed in the proverb "he who wills the end, wills the means". It has also been suggested that additional requirements of rationality concern the consistency between one's beliefs and one's intentions.

=== Conscious and unconscious ===
Of special importance to psychology and psychoanalysis is the difference between conscious and unconscious intentions. Unconscious intentions are often used to explain cases where an agent behaves a certain way without being aware of this. This is especially relevant if the behavior is clearly directed at a goal while the agent does not consciously intend to pursue this goal or is not even aware of having this goal. At first, unconscious intentions are usually ascribed to the agent by spectators and may only be avowed by the agent themselves retrospectively. But this form of explanation is not always conclusive, since, at least for some cases, other explanations are available as well. For example, some behavior may be explained as the execution of a blind habit, which may occur with neither consciousness nor intention.

Various prominent examples, due to Sigmund Freud, involve slips of the tongue, like declaring a meeting to be closed when one intends to open it. Freud sees such phenomena not as unintentional errors but ascribes to them a deeper meaning as expressions of unconscious wishes. As a window to the unconscious, interpreting the unconscious intentions behind such phenomena and raising the patient's awareness of them are important aspects of Freudian psychoanalysis. But there is no general agreement as to whether this type of behavior should be seen as intentional behavior. Unconscious intentions are also sometimes used to explain apparently irrational behavior. In this sense, it has been claimed that excessive hand washing seen in some people with the obsessive-compulsive disorder may be motivated by an unconscious intention to wash away one's guilt, even though the person may cite very different reasons when asked.

Critics of the notion of "unconscious intentions" have raised doubts about the empirical evidence cited in favor of unconscious intentions, which is often based on interpretations resting on various controversial assumptions. Another line of argument is directed against the concept of "unconscious intention" itself. On this view, it is incoherent to talk of the mental states in question as unconscious intentions. The reason given for this is that intending something must be accompanied by some form of self-knowledge on the side of the agent about what is intended. This would not be possible if the mental state is unconscious.

=== Others ===
Various other distinctions among types of intentions are found in the academic literature. Conditional intentions are intentions to do something just in case a certain condition obtains. Planning to return a book to a friend on the condition that she asks for it is an example of a conditional intention. Having the unconditional intention to return the book, on the other hand, involves planning to return it independent of the friend's behavior. Unconditional intentions are stronger in the sense that the agent is fully committed to the course of action without relying on the presence of a triggering condition.

Another distinction can be drawn between intentions that act as means to other intentions and intentions to do something for its own sake. This is closely related to the difference between intrinsic and instrumental desires. For example, an intention to go to the supermarket may be based on another intention: the intention to eat. Because of this dependence, the agent would not have formed the earlier intention if the latter intention had been absent. In normal cases, the instrumental intention disappears if the intention it is based on does not exist anymore. In the example above, the agent may drop the intention to go to the supermarket if their doctor recommends them to start fasting. But there are special cases in which the instrumental intention persists nonetheless, sometimes referred to as motivational inertia.

== Formation of intentions ==
Intentions can arise in different ways. The paradigmatic type of intention formation happens through practical reason in the form of decisions. In this case, various alternatives are considered by the agent, who then chooses the most favorable one. This choice results in a commitment to the chosen plan of action and thereby constitutes the formation of an intention. Often the choice itself is preceded by deliberation. Deliberation involves formulating promising courses of action and assessing their value by considering the reasons for and against them. An example of this type of intention formation is a student who is up all night thinking about whether to major in English and then finally decides to do so. But not all decisions are preceded by deliberation and not every act of deliberation results in a decision. Another type of intention formation happens without making any explicit decision. In such cases, the agent just finds themselves committed to the corresponding course of action without consciously deciding for it or against its alternatives. This is the case for many actions done out of habit. For example, habitually unlocking the office door in the morning is usually an intentional action that happens without a prior explicit decision to do so. It has been argued that decisions can be understood as a type of mental action that consists in resolving uncertainty about what to do. Decisions are usually seen as a momentary change from not having the intention to having it. This contrasts with deliberation, which normally refers to a drawn-out process. But these technical distinctions are not always reflected in how the terms are used in ordinary language.

== Psychological functions ==
Intentions have various psychological functions in the agent's mind. Some theorists of intentions even base their definition of intentions on the functions they execute. Intentions are responsible for initiating, sustaining, and terminating actions. In this sense, they are closely related to motivation. They also help guide the action itself and try to coordinate the agent's behavior over time. A similar function of intentions is to coordinate one's behavior with the behavior of other agents, either by forming intentions together or by reacting to the intentions others already have. This enables various complex forms of cooperation. Not every form of human behavior is guided by intentions. This concerns, for example, bodily reflexes like sneezing or other uncontrolled processes like digestion, which happen without following a previously devised mental plan. Intentions are intimately related to practical reason, i.e. to the reasons for which people act. These reasons are often explained in terms of beliefs and desires. For example, the agent's reason to cross a road may consist in their desire to reach the other side and their belief that this is achieved by crossing it. Because of this close connection to behavior, intentions are frequently used to explain why people engage in certain behavior. Such explanations are often teleological in the sense that they cited the intended goal as the reason for the behavior.

== Knowledge of the intention of others ==
=== Developmental psychology ===
Developmental psychology is, among other things, concerned with how children learn to ascribe intentions to others. Understanding intention is thought to be pivotal in understanding social contexts in numerous ways. First, acquiring an understanding of intention is important for development in that it helps children conceptualize how people and animals differ from objects. Much of behavior is caused by intentions, and understanding intentions helps to interpret these behaviors. Second, intentions are integral to an understanding of morality. Children learn to assign praise or blame based on whether actions of others are intentional. Intention is also necessary to understand and predict the plans and future actions of others. Understanding the intentions and motives of others aids in the interpretation of communication, and the achievement of cooperative goals.

Psychological research suggests that understanding intentions of others may be a prerequisite for a higher-level understanding of other people's minds or theory of mind. Theory of mind research attempts to map how children come to understand the mind as a representational device for the world. This research has focused on the development of knowledge that others have beliefs, desires, and intentions that are different from one's own. A basic ability to comprehend other people's intentions based on their actions is critical to the development of theory of mind. Social, cognitive and developmental psychological research has focused on the question: How do young children develop the ability to understand other people's behaviors and intentions?

==== Infancy and early childhood ====
From an early age, typically developing children parse human actions in terms of goals, rather than in terms of movements in space, or muscle movements. Meltzoff (1995) conducted a study in which 18-month-olds were shown an unsuccessful act. For instance, children watched an adult accidentally under or over shoot a target, or attempt to perform an action but their hand slipped. The aim of the study was to determine whether the children were able to interpret the intention of the adult, regardless of the actual action performed. Young children have a tendency to imitate other people's actions. The outcome measure was what the child chose to re-enact—the actual event (literal motions), or the adult's goal, which was not accomplished. The results of the study suggested that 18-month-olds are able to infer unseen goals and intentions of others based on their actions. Infants who saw unsuccessful attempts at a target act and infants who saw the target act imitated the act at a higher rate than infants who saw neither the act nor an attempt. Similar paradigms were conducted with children 9 months old and 15 months old. Nine-month-olds did not respond to the unsuccessful attempt demonstrations; however, 15-month-olds acted similarly to the 18-month-olds. This suggests that between 9 months and 15 months of age the ability to infer intentions in other people develops.

The development of understanding intention has also been studied in toddlers. As mentioned previously, an intentional action is based on the belief that the course of action will satisfy a desire. In that case, what was intended can be interpreted as a function of an understanding for what was desired. When outcomes are achieved without the action of the individual directed at the goal, intention is not attributed to the actor; rather, the event is considered an accident. Research by Astington and colleagues (1993) found that 3-year-olds are skilled at matching goals to outcomes to infer intention. If another individual's goals match an outcome, 3-year-olds are able to conclude that the action was done "on purpose." Conversely, when goals do not match outcomes, the children labeled the individual's actions as accidental. Children may come to distinguish between desire and intention when they learn to view the mind as a medium for representations of the world. Astington argues that initially desire is undifferentiated from intention in that both function as a goal state. Children then develop a more mature command of understanding other's intentions when they are able to represent an action as caused by a prior intention that is separate from desire.

Thus, research suggests that by the age of fifteen months, humans are capable of understanding intentional acts in others. The ability to distinguish between intention and desire develops in early childhood. Gestures and object-directed actions have also been studied in connexion with the development of the understanding of intention. The development of the ability to use gestures and object-directed actions in social situations has been studied from numerous perspectives, including the embodiment perspective and the social-cognitive perspective.

==== Gestures and pointing ====
Gestures are often recognized as a tool indicative of higher social reasoning. In order to engage in or understand a gesture, an individual has to recognize it as an indicator of an object or event separate from the self or the actor. It is thought that pointing, especially declarative pointing (i.e. pointing intended to direct and share intention rather than request an object), reveals the understanding of others as attentional and intentional agents (e.g. Liszkowski, Carpenter, & Tomasello, 2007). This understanding is indicated by object-directed reactions to pointing (rather than focusing on the hand). Pointing is also thought to denote perspective-taking ability and understanding of intention, as the individual must be able to understand that the actor is attending to the object and, perhaps most importantly, that the actor is attempting to communicate information regarding the referent. The development of pointing is thought to reach a critical stage at around 9 to 12 months in normally developing children (e.g. Leung & Rheingold, 1981; Moll & Tomasello, 2007; Schaffer, 2005). Liszkowski, Carpenter and colleagues (2004) found that human children begin to point at around one year of age and do so with a multiple motives, including sharing attention and interest. Earlier pointing may be different in nature and is thought to develop from a learned association between reaching and adult responsiveness to the child's desire for a referent object.

Thus, it seems pointing may be more complex than a straightforward indicator of social understanding. Early pointing may not indicate an understanding of intention; rather it may indicate an association between the gesture and interesting objects or events. However, an understanding of intention may develop as the child develops a theory of mind and begins to use pointing to convey meaning about referents in the world.

==== Attention and eye movement ====
Research suggests that faces are pivotal in offering social cues necessary for children's cognitive, language, and social development. These cues may offer information on another's emotional state, focus of attention, and potential intentions. (For a discussion see Mosconi, Mack, McCarthy, & Pelphrey, 2005.) Intention may be ascribed to an individual based on where in space that individual is attending. Intention is understood not only through actions and the manipulation of objects, but by tracking eye movements. Research in this area is focused on how humans develop the understanding that eye gaze indicates that the observer may be psychologically connected to the referent.

=== Intention-ascription based on biological motion ===
Neuroimaging research suggests that biological motion is processed differently from other types of motion. Biological motion is processed as a category in which individuals are able to infer intention. An evolutionary perspective of this phenomenon is that humans survived on the basis of being able to predict the internal mental states and potential future actions of others. Research on biological motion has found cells in the primate superior temporal polysensory area (STP) that respond specifically to biological motion. In addition, there are brain regions, including the superior temporal sulcus, that respond to biological but not non-biological motion. These findings suggest that humans may have a biologically based affinity for spotting and interpreting purposeful, biological motions.

In one experiment, 18-month-olds observed either a human or a mechanical arm attempting to perform actions, but failing to achieve a goal. The children imitated the action to complete the intended goal when the arm was human, but not when it was mechanical. This suggests that from a young age, humans are able to infer intention specifically as a biological mechanism between motions and goals.

Humans have a tendency to infer intention from motion, even in the absence of other distinguishing features (e.g. body shape, emotional expression). This was demonstrated in a study by Heider and Simmel; they had observers view videos of moving triangles, and found that participants tended to attribute intentions and even personality traits to the shapes based on their movements. The movement had to be animate, meaning self-propelled and non-linear.

Johansson devised a way to study biological motion without interference from other characteristics of humans such as body shape, or emotional expression. He attached dots of light to actors' joints and recorded the movements in a dark environment, so that only the dots of light were visible. The Johansson figures, as they came to be known, have been used to demonstrate that individuals attribute mental states, such as desires and intentions to movements, that are otherwise disconnected from context.

=== Simulation theory ===
The simulation hypothesis holds that in order to understand intention in others, individuals must observe an action, and then infer the actor's intentions by estimating what their own actions and intentions might be in the situation. Individuals connect their own actions to internal mental states through the experience of sensory information when movements are carried out; this sensory information is stored and connected to one's own intentions. Since internal mental states, such as intention, cannot be understood directly through observing movements, it is hypothesized that these internal states are inferred based on one's own stored representations of those movements.

This theory is supported by research on mirror neurons, or neural regions, including the premotor cortex, and parietal cortex, that activate both when individuals are engaging in an action, and when they are observing the actions of others. This suggests individuals may be simulating the motor movements via internal representations of their own motor movements. Thus, research indicates that humans are hard-wired to notice biological motion, infer intention, and use previous mental representations to predict future actions of others.

== In criminal law ==
Intention or intent is a key aspect in criminal law. It refers to the state of mind of the perpetrator, specifically to their plan to commit a crime. As such, it belongs to the mental element of the crime, known as mens rea, and not to the physical element, actus reus. Some form of mens rea is usually required for criminal offenses but legal transgressions committed without it can still be grounds for civil liability. The severity of criminal offenses often depends on the type and the degree of intent involved. But the specific characterizations and the role of intent differ from jurisdiction to jurisdiction.

In criminal law, an important distinction is between general and specific intent. General intent is the weaker term. It implies that the person meant to act the way they did. It does not imply that they wanted to cause harm or that they were trying to achieve a particular result, unlike specific intent. For some offenses, general intent is sufficient while for others, specific intent is required. For example, battery and manslaughter are usually seen as general intent offenses while for murder, a specific intent is required. This distinction is closely related to the difference between direct and indirect intent, but not identical to it. Direct intent refers to the desire to bring about a specific outcome. Indirect intent is about an almost certain outcome of an action that the agent is aware of but does not actively want. For example, if Ben intends to murder Ann with a stone by throwing it at her through a closed window then murdering Ann is a direct intent while breaking the window is an indirect intent.

For most criminal offenses, to ensure a conviction, the prosecution must prove that there was intent (or another form of mens rea) in addition to showing that the accused physically committed the crime. There are different ways in which intent can be proved or disproved depending on the case and the type of intent involved. One way to do so is to look at previous statements by the accused to assess whether a motive was present. For example, if a female employee is accused of murdering her male boss, then her previous blog posts condemning the patriarchal society and idolizing women who killed men could be used as evidence of intent. Certain forms of evidence can also be employed by the defense to show that intent was not present. For example, a person suffering from seizures could claim that, when they hit another person, they did not do so intentionally but under the effect of a seizure. If the perpetrator was intoxicated during the crime, this may be used as a defense by claiming that no specific intent was present. This is based on the idea that the defendant was mentally too impaired to form a specific intent.

== Relation to other concepts ==
=== Beliefs and desires ===
Intentions are closely related to other mental states, like beliefs and desires. It is generally accepted that intentions involve some form of desire: the intended action is seen as good or desirable in some sense. This aspect makes it possible for intentions to motivate actions. Various ways have been suggested how intentions are related to beliefs. On the one hand, it seems impossible to intend to do something one believes to be impossible. Some accounts go even further and suggest that intentions involve the belief that one will perform the action in question. Besides that, it has been suggested that beliefs are necessary for intentions to connect the behavior to the intended goal. On this view, intentions involve the belief that the intended behavior would cause the intended goal.

=== Action ===
In the philosophy of action, a central question is how actions are to be defined, i.e. how they differ from other types of events like a sunrise, a car breaking down, or digestion. The most common approach to this question defines actions in terms of intentions. According to Donald Davidson, an action is an event that is intentional under some description. On this view, it is a central aspect of actions that they are caused by an agent's mental state: their intention. Another important aspect is that this causation happens in the right way, i.e. that the intention causes the event it planned and that the event is caused by employing the agent's abilities. These additional requirements are needed to exclude so-called "wayward" causal chains, i.e. cases in which the intended behavior happens but the corresponding intention either did not cause the behavior at all or did not cause it in the right way.

Some philosophers have rejected this close link between action and intention. This criticism is based on the idea that a person can perform an action intentionally without having a corresponding intention to perform this action. Doing something intentionally is usually associated with doing it for a reason. The question then is whether doing something for a reason is possible without having a corresponding intention. This is especially relevant for simple actions that are part of bigger routines. Walking to the cinema, for example, involves taking various steps. According to this argument, each step is an intentional action but the agent does not form a distinct intention for each step. Instead, most of them are not explicitly represented by the mind. Another counterexample against the thesis that performing an action intentionally involves intending to perform this action is based on the awareness of unintended side-effects, sometimes referred to as oblique intentions. One example consists of a chairman deciding to endorse a new project to boost profits despite its negative impact on the environment. In this case, it has been argued that the chairman intentionally harms the environment without an intention to do so.

==== Toxin puzzle ====
A well-known thought experiment concerning the relation between intention and action is the toxin puzzle due to Gregory Kavka. It involves a billionaire offering the agent one million dollars for forming the intention by the end of the day to drink a vial of toxin the following day. The toxin makes a person ill for one day but has no lasting effect otherwise. It does not matter whether the agent actually drinks the toxin the next day, all that matters is that they have the intention to do so by the end of today. The puzzle concerns the question of whether it is possible to really form this intention. The reason for doubting this is that once the agent has formed the intention and received the money, they have no reason anymore to actually drink the toxin: this step is optional. But if they know all along that they will not drink the toxin after all, it is highly questionable whether they can actually form the corresponding intention. This is closely related to the idea that intending something entails believing that one will do it. But since the agent has no reason to actually do it once they have received the money, they would not believe that they would do it. This counts against the idea that they can intend it to begin with.

Various philosophers agree that it is impossible to form this type of intention. Their goal is often to find a general principle explaining why this is the case. Various accounts focus on the idea that the reason to perform the action is absent when it is time to perform it. So the agent has a reason to form the intention today but not a reason to perform the action tomorrow. So the reason for forming the intention is different from the reason for performing the action. This is sometimes expressed by saying that the agent has the "wrong type of reason" to form the intention. On this account, it is impossible to form the intention because the right type of reason for the intention is derivative of the reason for the action itself, which is absent.

But not everyone agrees that forming the intention is impossible. According to the rationalist solution, for example, it is possible to form the intention because there is a decisive reason to drink the toxin. The idea behind this approach is that there are two options today: (1) not form the intention and not drink the toxin or (2) form the intention and drink the toxin. Since the second option maximizes utility, it is rational to follow it and drink the toxin. The difficulty for this approach concerns explaining how the agent can hold onto their intention to drink the toxin after they have received the money.

==== Theory of reasoned action ====
Although human behavior is extremely complex and still remains unpredictable, psychologists are trying to understand the influential factors in the process of forming intentions and performing actions. The theories of Reasoned Action and Planned Behavior are comprehensive theories that specify a limited number of psychological variables that can influence behavior, namely (a) intention; (b) attitude toward the behavior; (c) subjective norm; (d) perceived behavioral control; and (e) behavioral, normative and control beliefs. In the theory of reasoned action, intention is influenced by people's attitude toward performing the behavior and the subjective norm. However, the level of perceived control is believed to be influential on people's behavioral intention along with their attitude and subjective norms, according to the theory of planned behavior. Not surprisingly, in most studies, intention is driven by attitudes to a greater extent than by subjective norms.

The predictive validity of the theory of Reasoned Action has been examined in numerous studies that have previously served as literature for at least three quantitative reviews. Ajzen and Fishbein (1973) reviewed 10 studies and reported a .63 average correlation for the prediction of behavior from intentions and a mean multiple correlation of .76 for the equation predicting intentions from both attitudes and norms. With similar objectives but larger samples, Sheppard et al.'s and van den Putte's meta-analyses estimated correlations of .53 and .62 for the prediction of behavior and multiple correlations of .66 and .68, respectively, for the prediction of intentions. All these studies have reflected the strong correlation that exists between people's attitudes, social norms and their intentions, as well as between their intention and the prediction of their behaviors. However, these correlations do not remain unchanged across all the conditions in people's life. Although people are likely to develop intentions to perform the action in question if they have a favorable attitude and perceive the behavior as controllable, then people's perception of control would be irrelevant to intentions when people have negative attitudes and perceive normative pressure not to perform certain actions. Research has also shown that people are more likely to perform an action if they have previously formed the corresponding intentions. Their intentions to perform the action appear to derive from attitudes, subjective norms, and perceived behavioral control. To state an example: The reason one may be motivated to consume alcohol after work is determined by several factors: (1) Intention. The idea that drinking can help an individual relieve stress and enjoy one's time, for example, can greatly influence the attitude towards post-work drinking. (2) Subjective norms in one's surroundings. This factor is mainly cultural, so how much a society values and rewards drinking, but also strongly influenced by one's immediate social circle's values about this specific issue. (3) Perceived behavioural control towards the intended behaviour, specifically regarding the amounts of alcohol consumed. (4) Trends in behaviour. The longer the behaviour has been influenced by the previous factors, the more likely the behaviour is prone to be repeated as the original intention becomes reinforced.

How people think about and verbally communicate their own intentions also impacts these intentions. For example, asking a question about prior behaviors using the imperfective aspect of language seems to be able to bring out stronger intentions to perform such a behavior in the future. According to the World Atlas of Language Structures, "Imperfective Aspects" refers to a specific form of language structure used for reference to the present and the future but also for ongoing and habitual events in the past. For example, 'He writes/is writing/wrote/was writing/will write letters.' People are more likely to interpret the event as ongoing, and likely to resume the action in the future when it has been described with the imperfective verb aspect. Similarly, using present tense to describe an action as ongoing may strengthen intentions to perform the same action in the future. Previous research has showed that both information on past behavior and their attitude towards such behavior play crucial roles in predicting people's future behavioral tendency. Recent research done by Carrera and others concluded that verb tense may not have direct influence on intentions, however it could still affect the type of information used as a basis of behavioral intentions. When participants described a past episode using the present tense, they consistently used the more concrete past behavior as a basis for their intentions. In contrast, when participants described a past episode using the past tense, they consistently used the more abstract attitude as a basis for their intentions.

=== Morality ===
It is often suggested that the agent's intentions play a central role in the moral value of the corresponding actions. This is sometimes termed the "intention principle": the thesis that whether an action is morally permissible sometimes depends on the agent's intention for performing this action. On this view, an otherwise permissible act may be impermissible if it is motivated by bad intentions. For example, a doctor administers a lethal drug to a suffering and terminally ill patient who consents. Defenders of the intention principle may claim that it depends on the doctor's intention whether this action is permissible. Specifically, this concerns whether it is done with the intention to relieve the patient's pain or with the intention of getting rid of a despised enemy. Opponents may claim that the moral difference in question only concerns the evaluation of the doctor as a person but not of their action. On this view, there is a difference between the moral values of persons and of actions: intentions concern the moral value of persons but not of actions. The intention principle is usually also rejected by consequentialists. They hold that only the consequences of an action matter but not how it was motivated. According to utilitarians, for example, an action is right if it produces the greatest good for the greatest number of people. In some cases, even actions performed with bad intentions may have this effect.

Immanuel Kant is a famous defender of the intention principle. For him, it is central that one does not just act outwardly in accordance with one's duty, which he terms "legality" (Legalität). Instead, the agent should also be inwardly motivated by the right intention, which he terms "morality" (Moralität). On this view, donating a lot of money to charities is still in some sense morally flawed if it is done with the intention of impressing other people. According to Kant, the main intention should always be to do one's duty: the good will consist in doing one's duty for the sake of duty.

The doctrine of double effect is a closely related principle. It states that there are cases in which the agent may not intend to harm others, even if this harm is used as means to a greater good. But in otherwise equivalent cases it is permissible to harm others if this harm is a side effect, or a double effect, but not a means. On this view, for example, terror bombing an ammunition factory in order to weaken the enemy's resolve by killing all the civilians working in it is impermissible. But performing the same attack as a tactical bombing in order to reduce the enemy's ammunition supply is permissible, even if the same amount of civilian deaths were foreseen as a side effect. Many of the arguments directed at the intention principle also apply to the doctrine of double effect. Additional arguments focus on the difficulty of drawing a general distinction between intended means and foreseen side-effects.

== See also ==
- Collective intentionality
- Entention
- Intention (criminal law)
- Intentional stance
- Intentionality
- Intentions (disambiguation)
- Motivation
- Scienter
- Telos (philosophy)
