= Conceptual =

Conceptual may refer to:

== Philosophy and Humanities ==
- Concept
- Conceptualism
- Philosophical analysis (Conceptual analysis)
- Theoretical definition (Conceptual definition)
- Thinking about Consciousness (Conceptual dualism)
- Pragmatism (Conceptual pragmatism)
- Paradigm (Conceptual scheme)
- Abstract and concrete (Conceptual object)
- Conceptual attrition, an idea of Beverley Skeggs
- Conceptual proliferation
- Conceptual history
- Conceptual necessity

== Linguistics and Semantics ==
- Conceptual schema
- Conceptual metaphor
- Conceptual model
- Conceptual blending
- Conceptual semantics
- Conceptual dictionary
- Conceptual change
- Conceptual dependency theory
- Conceptual domain in Frame semantics (linguistics)
- Inferential role semantics (Conceptual role semantics)

== Psychology ==
- Priming (psychology) (Conceptual priming)
- Spatial–temporal reasoning (Visuo-conceptual)
- Conceptual act model of emotion
- Conceptual space

== Science ==
- Conceptual physics
- Conceptual economy
- Conceptual model (computer science)
- Conceptual clustering
- The Mythical Man-Month (Conceptual integrity)

== Methodology and Data-modeling ==
- Conceptual system
- Conceptual framework
- The Conceptual Framework
- Entity–relationship model (Conceptual Entity Model)
- Conceptual graph
- CIDOC Conceptual Reference Model

== Art and Music ==
- Conceptual art
- Conceptual design
- Conceptual architecture
- Conceptual photography
- Post-conceptual
- Neo-conceptual art
- Progressive metal (Conceptual metal)
- Progressive rock (Conceptual rock)
- Concept album
- NSCAD conceptual art
- The View from this Tower (Conceptual Separation)
- Conceptual Love

== Law ==
- Conceptual separability in Copyright

== See also ==
- Concept (disambiguation)
