= Organic growth =

Business growth based on output and customer increases

Organic business growth is related to the growth of natural systems and organisms, societies and economies, as a dynamic organizational process, i.e. it relates to business expansion founded on increased output, customer base expansion, and new product development, as opposed to growth by mergers and acquisitions, which is inorganic growth. An early reference to "organic growth" appeared in Inazo Nitobe's 1899 book The Soul of Japan.

== Overview ==
Organic business growth is growth that comes from a company's existing businesses, as opposed to growth that comes from acquiring other existing businesses. It may be negative. Through growth planning, businesses are able to achieve organic growth by selecting the best strategies available to them. For example, by examining Ansoff's matrix, businesses can select from market penetration, market development, product development and diversification to grow their revenue organically. In addition, organic business growth can be achieved using content marketing efforts, which drive organic search traffic.

Organic business growth does include growth over a period that results from investment in businesses the company owned at the beginning of the period. What it excludes is the boost to growth from acquisitions, and the decline from sales and closures of whole businesses.

When a company does not disclose organic growth numbers, it is usually possible to estimate them by estimating the numbers for acquisitions made in the period being looked at and in the previous year. It is useful to break down organic sales growth into that coming from market growth and that coming from gains in market share: this makes it easier to see how sustainable growth is.

Relating to organic input in an organisation, it can also relate to the act of closing down cost centers through established organic methods instead of waiting for a Finance list.

The mechanisms and rate of growth of firms experiencing organic growth was extensively studied by Edith Penrose in her 1958 book The Theory of the Growth of the Firm.

Organic Growth is evolving to a new concept within the social media marketing of the 21st century. Social networks also do organic growth in terms of followers and social presence.

== See also ==
- Inorganic growth
- Mergers and acquisitions
- Organic volume
