= Growth planning =

Growth planning is a strategic business activity that enables business owners to plan and track organic growth in their revenue. It allows businesses to allocate their limited resources toward a centered effort to adapt to changes in the industry driven by digital disruption and differentiate from competitors. The strategies and tactics included in a growth plan focus on the key driver of revenue generation - the customer.

== Why businesses develop a growth plan ==
Businesses often develop a growth plan following certain trigger events. These could include a lack of sales, intense competition and unexpected growth. Businesses in situations like these will develop a growth plan to prioritize resources and take corrective action to stay on track.

== what is in a growth plan ==
A growth plan only contains the elements of a business where the customer can see value. It begins by setting out business goals and leads to the strategies and tactics for reaching them. The benefit of this is it enables businesses to connect their goals with precise actions. Small businesses focus on market penetration to sell more to existing customers. A growth plan for more mature small businesses is market development where they sell existing offerings to a different market (e.g. a neighboring state or country). Larger businesses tend to focus on reaching customers through alternate channels (e.g. online) or broadening their target customer through product development to solve their unique problems.

When starting to develop a growth plan, 3 key questions are considered:

1. What is the current state of the business?
2. What do the key stakeholders envision the future state to be?
3. How do you bridge the gap?

To answer these questions, businesses outline the following 9 step blueprint:

Step	Core Topic	Description
1	Business goals	Succinct and aligned with the direction for the company
2	SWOT	A snapshot of current strengths, weaknesses, opportunities and threats to help with visibility over future potential and areas of improvement/concern
3	Client segments	Narrowing down on a target market
4	Growth strategies	To navigate through obstacles and make the most of opportunities
5	Objectives	Key metrics for business goals
6	Value proposition	The reason customers should buy your offering
7	Competitive analysis	Differentiation against competitors
8	Digital execution	Digital marketing campaigns to acquire and retain customers
9	Tactics	Clear actions to achieve the plan

== Preparing for growth ==
When implementing a growth plan, management will investigate whether it is aligned with the current organizational structure. In cases where it is not aligned, management must question whether to adapt the organizational structure or not. Further, rapid growth can place pressure on existing processes. If processes aren’t scalable, management should address these issues before growing as the costs of fixing the problems afterwards is greater.

== Business plan vs growth plan ==
A business plan focuses on the business goals and background information about the organization and key team members. It is commonly developed for a 3-5 year time frame and is useful when seeking external funding from either banks or investors.

On the other hand, a growth plan is short term, typically 1–2 years or less. It focuses at a much deeper level on the go-to-market section usually seen in a business plan. Growth planning aims to be agile and adapt to changing market conditions that businesses are facing, particularly through technology and digital media.
