= Diversification (marketing strategy) =

Expansion to new products, services, or markets

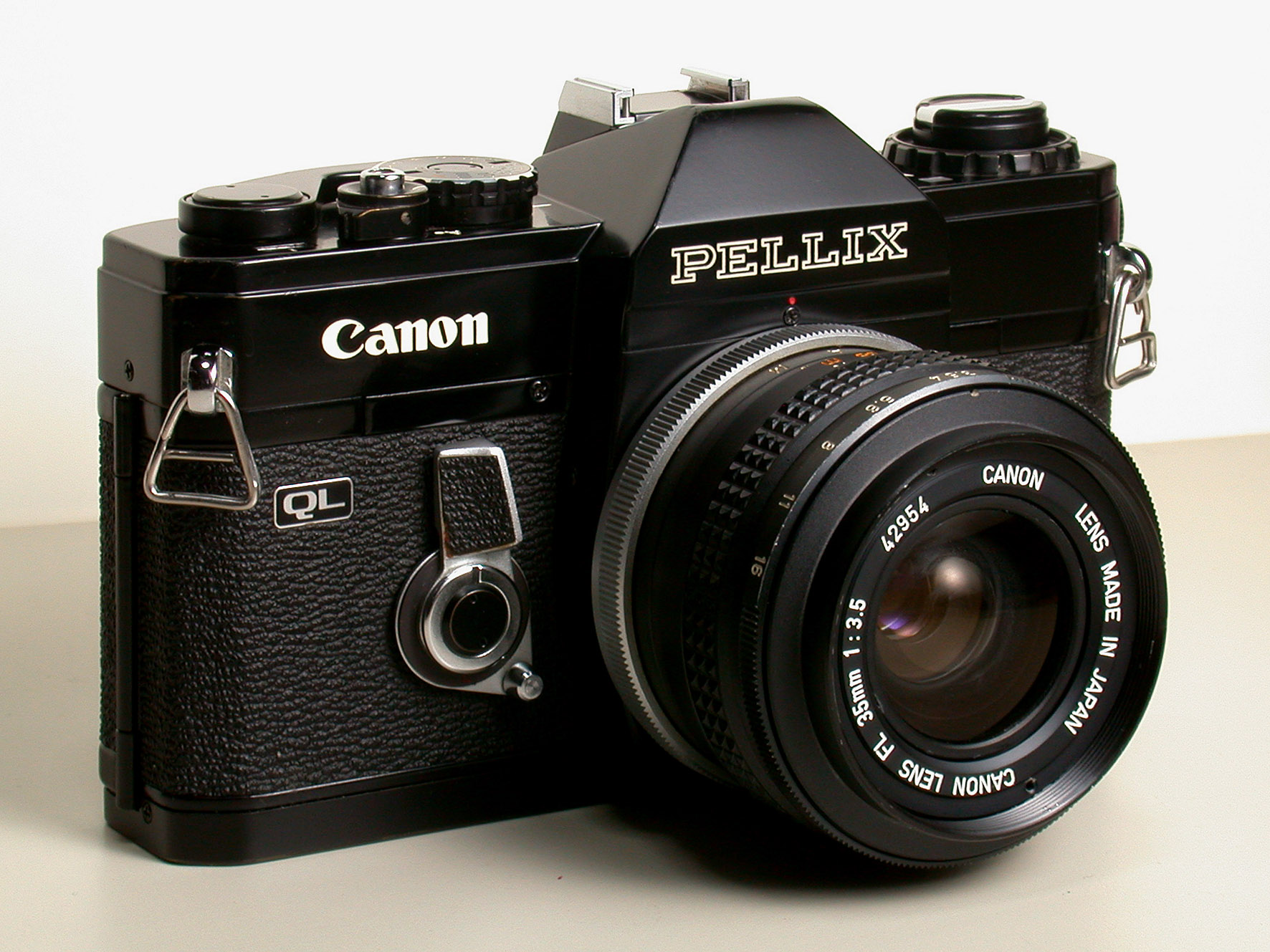
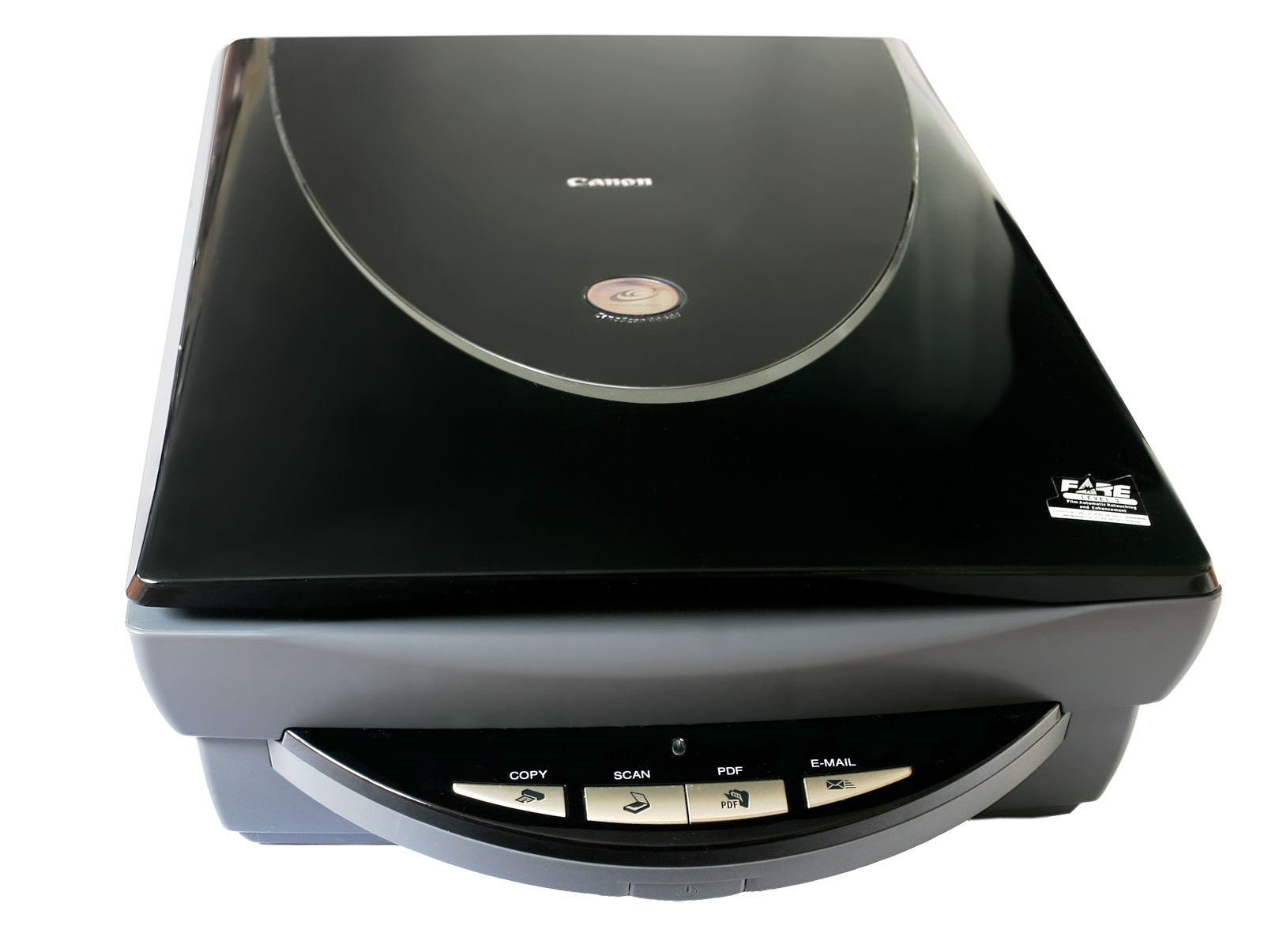
Canon Inc. diversified from exclusively making cameras to producing various office supplies.

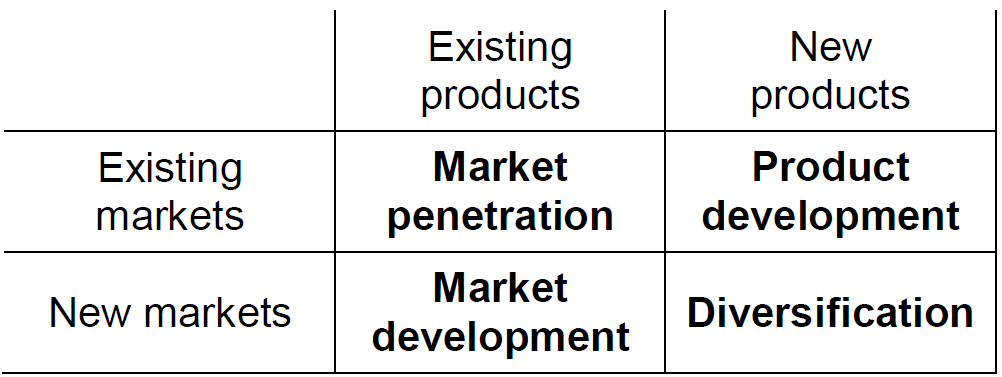
The Ansoff matrix compares market penetration, product development, market development and diversification.

Diversification is a corporate strategy to enter into or start new products or product lines, new services or new markets, involving substantially different skills, technology and knowledge.

Diversification is one of the four main growth strategies defined by Igor Ansoff in the Ansoff Matrix:

		Products	
		Present	New
Markets	Present	Market penetration	Product development
Markets	New	Market development	Diversification

Ansoff pointed out that a diversification strategy stands apart from the other three strategies. Whereas, the first three strategies are usually pursued with the same technical, financial, and merchandising resources used for the original product line, the diversification usually requires a company to acquire new skills and knowledge in product development as well as new insights into market behavior simultaneously. This not only requires the acquisition of new skills and knowledge, but also requires the company to acquire new resources including new technologies and new facilities, which exposes the organisation to higher levels of risk.

Note: The notion of diversification depends on the subjective interpretation of "new" market and "new" product, which should reflect the perceptions of customers rather than managers. Indeed, products tend to create or stimulate new markets; new markets promote product innovation.

Product diversification involves addition of new products to existing products either being manufactured or being marketed. Expansion of the existing product line with related products is one such method adopted by many businesses. Adding tooth brushes to tooth paste or tooth powders or mouthwash under the same brand or under different brands aimed at different segments is one way of diversification. These are either brand extensions or product extensions to increase the volume of sales and the number of customers.

== A typology of diversification strategies ==
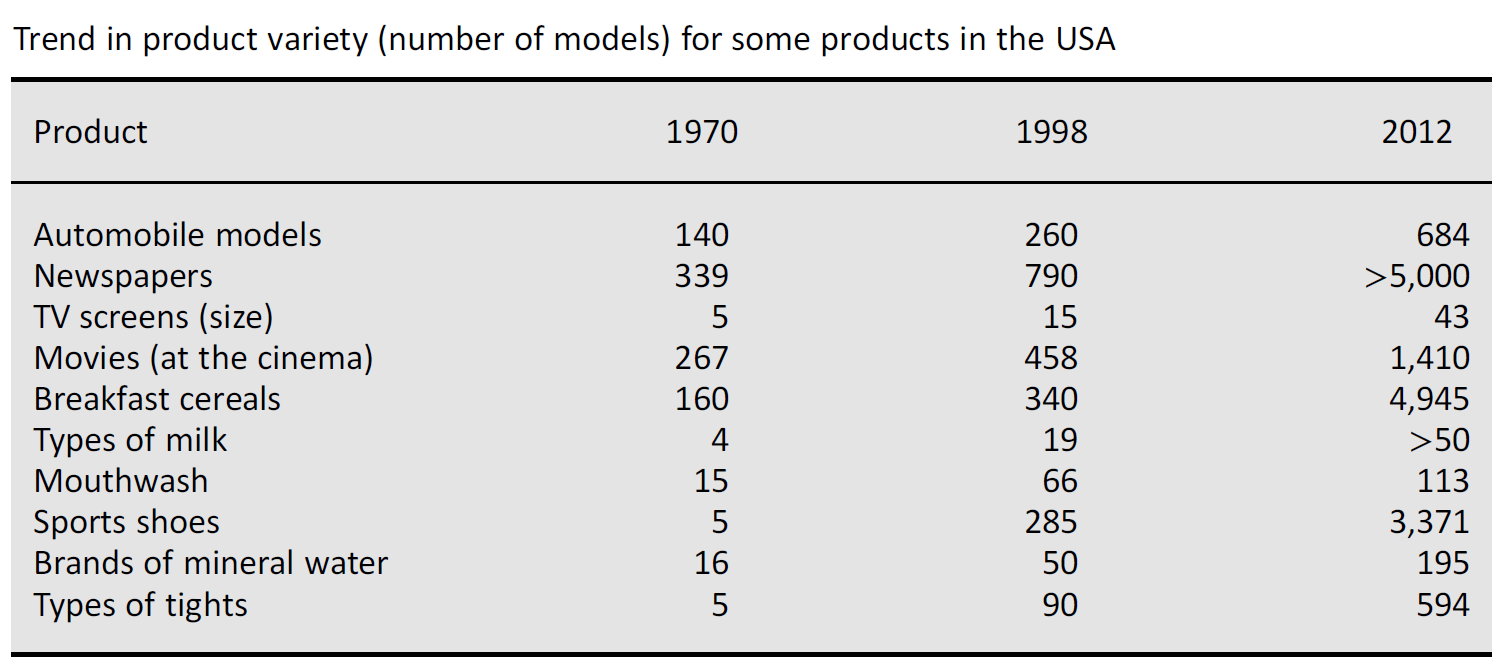
Trend in product variety for some models in the USA

The strategies of diversification can include internal development of new products or markets, acquisition of a firm, alliance with a complementary company, licensing of new technologies, and distributing or importing a products line manufactured by another firm. Generally, the final strategy involves a combination of these options. This combination is determined in function of available opportunities and consistency with the objectives and the resources of the company.

There are three types of diversification: concentric, horizontal, and conglomerate.

=== Concentric diversification ===
This means that there is a technological similarity between the industries, which means that the firm is able to leverage its technical know-how to gain some advantage. For example, a company that manufactures industrial adhesives might decide to diversify into adhesives to be sold via retailers. The technology would be the same but the marketing effort would need to change.

It also seems to increase its market share to launch a new product that helps the particular company to earn profit. For instance, the addition of tomato ketchup and sauce to the existing "Maggi" brand processed items of Food Specialities Ltd. is an example of technological-related concentric diversification.

The company could seek new products that have technological or marketing synergies with existing product lines appealing to a new group of customers. This also helps the company to tap that part of the market which remains untapped, and which presents an opportunity to earn profits.

=== Horizontal diversification ===
The company adds new products or services that are often technologically or commercially unrelated to current products but that may appeal to current customers. This strategy tends to increase the firm's dependence on certain market segments. For example, a company that was making notebooks earlier may also enter the pen market with its new product.

==== When is horizontal diversification desirable? ====
Horizontal diversification is desirable if the present customers are loyal to the current products and if the new products have a good quality and are well promoted and priced. Moreover, the new products are marketed to the same economic environment as the existing products, which may lead to rigidity or instability.

===== Another interpretation =====
Horizontal integration occurs when a firm enters a new business (either related or unrelated) at the same stage of production as its current operations. For example, Avon's move to market jewellery through its door-to-door sales force involved marketing new products through existing channels of distribution. An alternative form of that Avon has also undertaken is selling its products by mail order (e.g., clothing, plastic products) and through retail stores (e.g., Tiffany's). In both cases, Avon is still at the retail stage of the production process.

=== Conglomerate diversification (or lateral diversification) ===
Conglomerate diversification involves adding new products or services that are significantly unrelated and with no technological or commercial similarities. For example, if a computer company decides to produce stationery items, the company is pursuing a conglomerate diversification strategy.

== Goal of diversification ==
According to Calori and Harvatopoulos (1988), there are two dimensions of rationale for diversification. The first one relates to the nature of the strategic objective: Diversification may be defensive or offensive.

Defensive reasons may be spreading the risk of market contraction, or being forced to diversify when current product or current market orientation seems to provide no further opportunities for growth. Offensive reasons may be conquering new positions, taking opportunities that promise greater profitability than expansion opportunities, or using retained cash that exceeds total expansion needs.

The second dimension involves the expected outcomes of diversification: Management may expect great economic value (growth, profitability) or first and foremost great coherence with their current activities (exploitation of know-how, more efficient use of available resources and capacities). In addition, companies may also explore diversification just to get a valuable comparison between this strategy and expansion.

== Risks ==
Of the four strategies presented in the Ansoff matrix, Diversification has the highest level of risk and requires the most careful investigation. Going into an unknown market with an unfamiliar product offering means a lack of experience in the new skills and techniques required. Therefore, the company puts itself in a great uncertainty. Moreover, diversification might necessitate significant expanding of human and financial resources, which may detract the focus of management. Also, unrelated diversification often leads to increased inertia. Therefore, a firm should choose this option only when the current product or current market orientation does not offer further opportunities for growth. In order to measure the chances of success, different tests can be done:

- The attractiveness test: the industry that has been chosen has to be either attractive or capable of being made attractive.
- The cost-of-entry test: the cost of entry must not capitalize all future profits.
- The better-off test: the new unit must either gain competitive advantage from its link with the corporation or vice versa.

Because of the high risks explained above, many companies attempting to diversify have led to failure. However, there are a few good examples of successful diversification:

- Apple moved from PCs to mobile devices
- Virgin Group moved from music production to travel and mobile phones
- Walt Disney moved from producing animated movies to theme parks and vacation properties
- Canon diversified from a camera-making company into producing an entirely new range of office equipment.

== See also ==
- Harry Igor Ansoff
- Market development
- Market penetration
- Product development
- Product proliferation
- Pure play
