= Theodore Wan =

Chinese-Canadian photographer and artist

Theodore Saskatche Wan
- Born: Theodore Fu Wan; June 29, 1953; Hong Kong
- Died: May 21, 1987 (aged 33); Vancouver, British Columbia, Canada
- Education: 1972-1975, Bachelor of Fine Arts, School of Fine Arts, University of British Columbia, Vancouver, B.C.; 1976-1978, Master of Fine Arts, NSCAD University, Halifax, Nova Scotia.
- Known for: Photography, Performance art, Body art

Theodore Saskatche Wan (June 29, 1953 – May 21, 1987) was a Hong Kong-Canadian photographer, conceptual artist, and performance artist. Wan is most well known for his series of self-portraits in which the artist positioned himself as the "patient" in medical and surgical-style instructional photographs.

He founded the artist-run centre Main Exit Gallery at 901 Main Street in Vancouver, BC (1980-1982).

== Early life ==
Theodore Fu Wan was born on June 29, 1953 in Hong Kong. Wan emigrated with his family to Vancouver, British Columbia, Canada in 1967 at age thirteen.

== Career ==
Beginning in 1972, Wan studied under such artists as Glenn Lewis and Fred Herzog as an undergraduate student in the fine arts program at the University of British Columbia. During this time, Wan went under the alter-ego "Mr. Normal," who dressed in formal attire such as bowler hats, suits and ties.

Wan began his graduate studies in 1975 at the Nova Scotia College of Art and Design (NSCAD) in Halifax, Nova Scotia. Wan's studio instructors included then-president Garry Kennedy (See: NSCAD conceptual art).

In 1977, Wan applied for an official name change to the Registrar General of Nova Scotia from Theodore Fu Wan to Theodore Saskatche Wan, after the village of Theodore, Saskatchewan as part of the work Name Change (1977).

Throughout his career, Wan developed an interest in the theories of Marcel Duchamp and in particular the readymade. At NSCAD, Wan developed an interest in medical and surgical illustrations and manuals and appropriated the tropes of such "official" imagery into his photographs. During this time, Wan became a photographer at the Dalhousie University’s School of Dentistry. In such series as Bridine Scrub For General Surgery (1977), Panoramic Dental X-Ray (1977), Draping Procedure For Shoulder Operation (1977), etc. the artist photographed himself as the "patient" in a series of medically accurate illustrations.

At the Centre For Art Tapes in Halifax, founded by Brian MacNevin, Wan had a solo show entitled The Inversion of The Readymade which marked the debut of two photographic series: Bound By Everyday Necessities I (1979) and Bound By Everyday Necessities II (1979). During the exhibition, Wan's photographs were shown in two distinct contexts: the "fine art" context of the gallery and also on the 13th floor of the Victoria General Hospital in Halifax. The photographs were viewed as conceptual interventions when displayed in the gallery while they were seen as instructional and "objective" at the hospital.

Upon his graduation from NSCAD, Wan returned to Vancouver where he opened the artist-run centre Main Exit at 901 Main Street which operated for two years from October 1980 to November 1982. After Main Exit closed, Wan operated a commercial photography service in which his clientele included exotic dancers, sex workers, and members of the Chinese-Canadian community. Wan photographed exotic dancers and members of nudist colonies under the pseudonym of Theo. For the rest of his life, Wan lived alongside his brother, mother and step-father and helped operate the family's funerary business.

Wan died of sinus cancer on May 21, 1987 at age 33.

The artist's archives are held at the Vancouver Art Gallery.

Posthumously, his work was the subject of a major touring retrospective, curated by Christine Conley, from 2003 to 2005 and was included in the 2010–2013 travelling survey exhibition Traffic: Conceptual Art In Canada 1965-1980.

== Selected exhibitions ==
Solo

- 1976 - Two 120 Rolls & Six 35mm Negatives, Photographs Not By Theodore Wan, Anna Leonowens Gallery NSCAD, Halifax, Nova Scotia
- 1978 - Please, No Photography Beyond This Point, Anna Leonowens Gallery NSCAD, Halifax, Nova Scotia
- 1979 - Theodore Sasketche Wan, Nova Gallery, Vancouver, BC
- 1979 - The Inversion Of The Readymade, The Centre For Art Tapes, Halifax, Nova Scotia
- 1980 - Theodore Sasketche Wan, Mercer Union, Toronto, ON

Group

- 1982 - WAN/LAKE (two-person show with Suzy Lake), SUB Art Gallery at University Of Alberta
- 1983 - Vancouver Art And Artists 1931-1983, Vancouver Art Gallery.

Posthumous

- 2003-2005 - Theodore Wan, Dalhousie Art Gallery, Ottawa Art Gallery, Liane and Danny Taran Gallery of the Saidye Bronfman Centre For The Arts, Vancouver Art Gallery, The Blackwood Gallery.
- 2010-2013 - Traffic: Conceptual Art In Canada 1965-1980, Art Gallery of Alberta, Halifax INK, Justina M. Barnicke Gallery, Leonard & Bina Ellen Art Gallery, Vancouver Art Gallery
- 2024 - Unit Bruises: Theodore Wan & Paul Wong, 1975-1979, Richmond Art Gallery
