= Peter W. Hewson =

South African science educator

- Born: South Africa
- Known for: Conceptual change theory in science education Science teacher education and professional development International research capacity building
- Awards: Distinguished Contributions to Science Education Through Research Award (NARST, 2009)

Academic background
- Education: University of Cape Town University of Oxford University of the Witwatersrand

Academic work
- Institutions: University of the Witwatersrand University of British Columbia Cornell University University of Wisconsin-Madison University of the Western Cape (visiting)

Peter W. Hewson is a South African-born science educator and Professor Emeritus at the University of Wisconsin-Madison. He is best known for his foundational contributions to conceptual change theory in science education, particularly as a co-author of the highly influential 1982 paper that framed student learning as a process of conceptual change.

His research spans student learning in science (from tertiary physics to primary and secondary students in physics, biology, and chemistry), science teaching, teachers’ conceptions of teaching, teacher education, professional development, and international research capacity building in southern Africa.

In 2009 he received the National Association for Research in Science Teaching (NARST) Distinguished Contributions to Science Education Through Research Award, the organization’s highest research honor.

== Early life and education ==
Hewson was born in South Africa. He earned a B.Sc.(Hons.) in Physics and Applied Mathematics from the University of Cape Town (1960-1965) and a D.Phil. in Theoretical Physics from the University of Oxford in 1968 as a Rhodes Scholar. His doctoral research examined interactions of pi-mesons with atomic nuclei. He later completed a postgraduate Higher Education Diploma (certification in Physics and Chemistry) at the University of the Witwatersrand in 1976.

== Career ==
After completing his doctorate, Hewson held a postdoctoral fellowship in the Department of Physics at the University of British Columbia (1968-1971). In 1971 he returned to South Africa and joined the Department of Physics at the University of the Witwatersrand (Wits) in Johannesburg as a Lecturer (later Senior Lecturer in 1976 and Associate Professor in 1983). He was appointed the department’s first physics methodologist, responsible for science teacher education, and taught undergraduate physics while helping establish new teacher-education programs.

In 1978-1979 he took sabbatical leave at Cornell University as Visiting Associate Professor in Physics and Visiting Fellow in Education. He remained at Wits until 1984.

In 1985 Hewson joined the Department of Curriculum and Instruction at the University of Wisconsin-Madison as Associate Professor (promoted to Professor in 1990), where he taught in undergraduate teacher education and graduate science education programs. He coordinated professional development schools in Madison and directed collaborative U.S.-South Africa projects in science and mathematics education. He also held visiting positions, including as Fulbright Senior Scholar and Visiting Professor at the University of the Western Cape (2006-2007). He is now Professor Emeritus.

== Research and contributions ==
Hewson’s scholarship is unified by the theme of conceptual change and has progressed across multiple interconnected domains: student learning in science, teaching for conceptual change, science teachers’ conceptions of teaching, initial teacher education, teacher professional development and systemic reform, and international research capacity building.

=== Conceptual change theory ===
Together with George J. Posner, Kenneth A. Strike, and William A. Gertzog, Hewson co-authored the seminal paper "Accommodation of a scientific conception: Toward a theory of conceptual change" (1982, Science Education), one of the most highly cited works in the field with over 10,000 citations. The paper proposed a model of learning as conceptual change in which students must become dissatisfied with their existing conceptions while finding new ones intelligible, plausible, and fruitful. Hewson further developed the model by conceptualizing the “status” of conceptions within a learner’s conceptual ecology (Hewson, 1981) and exploring its implications for instruction.

=== Teaching for Conceptual Change ===
He and his wife, Mariana G. A'B Hewson, co-authored influential papers applying conceptual change to teaching. This included work recognized as one of the most influential articles in the first 40 years of the Journal of Research in Science Teaching (Hewson & Hewson, 1983) with Mariana as the first author and the Outstanding Paper of 1988 in Science Education (Hewson & Hewson, 1988) on teachers’ conceptions of teaching science, with Peter as the first author.

=== Initial Teacher Education ===
He directed an NSF-funded project, together with B. Robert Tabachnick and Kenneth M. Zeichner that studied a science teacher education program at elementary and secondary levels. The project’s goal was to graduate teachers who held conceptual change conceptions of teaching science and were disposed to put them into practice. The outcomes of the study were published as 6 papers in a single issue (Science Education, 1999, Vol 83, Issue 3).

=== Professional Development ===
His research extended beyond pre-service science teacher education to in-service professional development, and systemic reform. He contributed to the widely used Designing Professional Development for Teachers of Science and Mathematics (co-author with Susan Loucks-Horsley et al.).

=== International Collaboration ===
In later years he focused on international collaboration, directing an NSF-funded project that supported doctoral-level exchanges between South Africa and the US and initiated an annual Research School in South Africa in 2003-4 to build research capacity in science and mathematics education. In 2005, SAARMSTE (Southern African Association for Research in Mathematics, Science and Technology Education) established a Research Capacity Building Committee that has organized annual Research Schools since then.

== Awards and honors ==
- 2009 - Distinguished Contributions to Science Education Through Research Award, NARST
- 2003 - Co-author of one of 13 most influential articles in the first 40 years of the Journal of Research in Science Teaching
- 1988 - Co-author of Outstanding Paper, Science Education
- 1965-1968 - Rhodes Scholarship
- 2006-2007 - Fulbright Senior Scholarship

== See also ==
- Conceptual change
- Constructivism (philosophy of education)
- Science education
- Physics education research
