= Organic volume =

Organic volume, similar to organic growth, is a term used in business to describe the volume of a product produced due to a specific business process and not due to external circumstances such as acquisition from a separate source. For example, imagine a paper company that produces 1 million sheets of notebook paper per month from a plant but also buys 500,000 sheets of notebook paper at a discount from a surplus supplier in that same month, then sells all 1.5 million sheets of paper. The total volume of notebook paper sold is 1.5 million sheets, however the organic volume of notebook paper sold is 1 million sheets of paper, since that was the amount actually produced from the paper company's own factory.
