= Journal of Product Innovation Management =

- Discipline: Business, management
- Language: English
- Edited by: Luigi de Luca, Gerda Gemser, Minu Kumar, Ruby Lee

Publication details
- History: 1984-present
- Publisher: Wiley-Blackwell on behalf of the Product Development and Management Association
- Frequency: Bimonthly
- Impact factor: 12.0 (2025)

Standard abbreviations
- ISO 4: J. Prod. Innov. Manag.

Indexing
- ISSN: 0737-6782 (print); 1540-5885 (web)
- LCCN: 84644704
- OCLC no.: 09425135

Links
- Journal homepage; Online access; online archive

The Journal of Product Innovation Management is a bimonthly peer-reviewed academic journal published by Wiley-Blackwell on behalf of the Product Development and Management Association. The current editors-in-chief are Luigi de Luca, Gerda Gemser, Minu Kumar, and Ruby Lee.

According to the Journal Citation Reports, the journal has a 2025 impact factor of 12.0, ranking it 3rd out of 69 journals in the category "Engineering, Industrial", 10th out of 323 journals in the category "Business", and 11th out of 426 journals in the category "Management". The journal received an "A" ranking as a marketing journal by 1100 business scholars in Germany, Austria, and Switzerland.

== Controversy ==
In 2012, the journal published a study that ranked the Henry W. Bloch School of Management (University of Missouri–Kansas City) number 1 in the world for research in innovation management. However, the methodology of the study and the independence of its authors were questioned. In March 2015, the journal published an "expression of concern" regarding the study. However, four independent scholars later reviewed the article and found its methodology to be acceptable.
