= Market penetration =

Successful selling of a good or service in a specific market

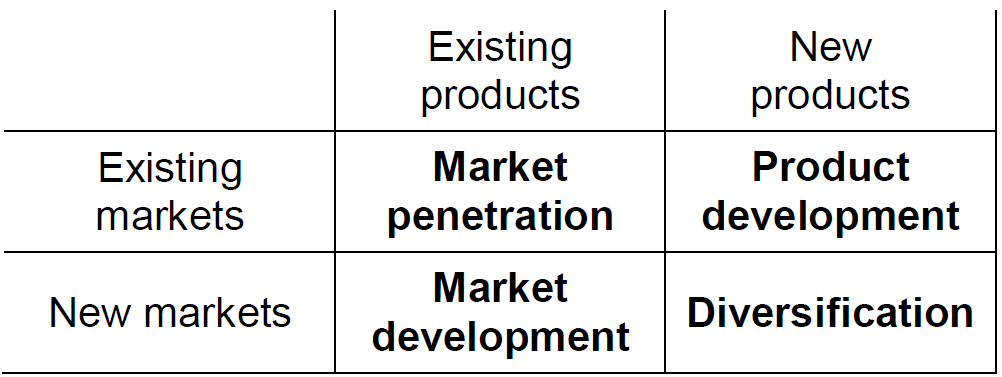
The Ansoff matrix compares market penetration, product development, market development and diversification.

Market penetration refers to the successful selling of a good or service in a specific market. It involves using tactics that increase the growth of an existing product in an existing market. It is measured by the amount of sales volume of an existing good or service compared to the total target market for that product or service. Market penetration is the key for a business growth strategy stemming from the Ansoff Matrix (Richardson, M., & Evans, C. (2007). H. Igor Ansoff first devised and published the Ansoff Matrix in the Harvard Business Review in 1957, within an article titled "Strategies for Diversification". The grid/matrix is utilized across businesses to help evaluate and determine the next stages the company must take in order to grow and the risks associated with the chosen strategy. With numerous options available, this matrix helps narrow down the best fit for an organization.

This strategy involves selling current products or services to the existing market in order to obtain a higher market share. This could involve persuading current customers to buy more and new customers to start buying or even converting customers from their competitors. This could be implemented using methods such as competitive pricing, increasing marketing communications, or utilizing reward systems such as loyalty points/discounts. New strategies involve utilizing pathways and finding new ways to improve profits and increase sales and productivity in order to stay competitive.

== Definition ==
Market penetration refers to ways or strategies that are proposed or adopted so as to be able to create a niche in the already existing market. Although it can be performed throughout the business's life, it can be especially helpful in the primary stages of setup. It helps establish the business's current station and which direction it needs to expand in to achieve market growth. Successful outcomes stem from careful monitoring by key staff and leaders. Timing is key to successful market growth; this can be dependent on the overall market welfare, the business's competitors, and current events. Questions, brainstorming, and discussions can help distinguish whether it is the best time for market growth. These can include questions surrounding market share increases or decreases. Sales can be declining but show opportunity for the business, which could be the perfect time to make alterations so as to grow market share. Market penetration can also be helpful when sales are proving to slow down, in that customers often need to be re-introduced to a company or reminded why they need a company's goods/services. With consumers' attention span becoming less and less, organizations need to constantly keep on top of competitors to stay relevant.

Some factors of market penetration are holding costs, advanced inventory management practices and technology (e.g., ongoing replenishment and vendor-managed inventory), supply chain problems, and economies of scale (e.g., Chang and Lee 1995, Chen et al. 2005, Gaur and Kesavan 2005, Gaur et al. 2005, Hendricks and Singhal 2005, Huson and Nanda 1995, Lieberman et al. 1996).

Market penetration, market development, and product development together establish market growth for a company. Overall the major growth opportunities they implement attempt to peak sales through stressing current products in present markets and present products in new markets. This includes developing new products for existing markets, subsequently. It is about finding new ways to boost sales and keep customers loyal and increase market share. When implementing change, companies must be careful not to compromise their existing revenue or customers. If the packaging or visual aspects of a company are altered drastically, existing customers may not recognise a brand and opt for a competitor's product or service. Too much alteration can make consumers wary, so change must be implemented in a subtle manner so as to only increase market share and build on profits. Managers and leaders should monitor this throughout the entire process to ensure smooth changes. Clear planning will also help minimise this risk and will lead to improvements and a boost in market share.

A few different options for market penetration are:

- Developing a new marketing strategy to entice more customers to purchase or continue purchasing.
- Become price competitive as a swaying factor for customers to choose a product or service over another company.
- Use special promotions or offers to grab attention.
- Utilise the Boston Matrix to decipher which product or service benefits further investment and time and which can be disregarded.
- Purchase a competitor's company (in mature markets) to expand market share.

For a business to come up with a decision using the grid, key personnel must consider numerous factors such as market penetration, product development, market development, and diversification, which measure brand popularity, defined as the number of people who buy a specific brand or a category of goods at least once in a given period, divided by the size of the relevant market population. Market penetration is one of the four growth strategies of the Product-Market Growth Matrix as defined by Ansoff. Market penetration occurs when a company penetrates a market in which current or similar products already exist. A way to achieve this is by gaining competitors' customers (part of their market share). Other ways include attracting non-users of a product or convincing current clients to use more of a product/service (by advertising, etc.). Ansoff developed the Product-Market Growth Matrix to help firms recognize if there is any advantage to entering a market. The other three growth strategies in the Product-Market Growth Matrix are:

- Product development (existing markets, new products): McDonald's is always within the fast-food industry but frequently markets new burgers.
- Market development (new markets, existing products): Apple introduced the iPhone in a developed cell phone market.
- Diversification (new markets, new products):

Market penetration refers to the successful selling of a product or service in a specific market, and it is a measure of the amount of sales volume of an existing good or service compared to the total target market for that product or service. Market penetration involves targeting on selling existing goods or services in the targeted markets to increase a better market share/value. It can be achieved in four different ways, including growing the market share of current goods or services; obtaining dominance of existing markets; reforming a mature market by monopolising the market and driving out competitors; or increasing consumptions by existing customers.

Another alternative to calculating market penetration is if the dividend growth rate is more than the ratio of the percentage population of wealth distribution ratio then market penetration is possible.

Market penetration is a way to determine the success of the business model and marketing strategy for a product. To check the success, one must have a way to gauge the amount of the targeted market and how many potential localized or otherwise customers there are that would be susceptible to a product. To this end, Charles Hill came up with a five-step system to understanding advertising's influence on the market.

1. Identify the demographic most suited to a product. Even though other demographics may use a product, it is about identifying the largest demographic so that the majority of advertising is tailored to them (e.g., candy for children, salad for adult women who may be dieting).
2. Decide upon the area in which they live. Location is important and wholly depends on the reach of a brand. If a company operates at a national level, then the entirety of the country will have to be averaged to reach the largest number of people. The smaller the area, the more specific one can be about the people of each demographic within it.
3. Knowing the size of the market is integral to understanding market penetration.
4. Understanding competitors' market penetration. What benchmark should one go for? Based on the penetration that other products have reached, calculate the number that should be reached in the demographic by multiplying the total number of the demographic by whatever the percentage that other products are reaching.
5. Calculate the number of customers that a business needs to sell to in order to earn a profit and then compare that to the number other competitors are reaching; if the business does not make a profit with average market penetration, it's time to rethink the business strategy.

Market penetration is a tool for understanding the potential earnings of a business and is integral to calculating a resourceful business model.

== In an emerging market ==
A model was theorized for market penetration by Yan Dong, Martin Dresner and Chaodong Han.

This is meant for emerging markets but the connection extends across to more established markets as well. The model illustrates that market penetration and understanding of the number of people that will be reached with a product is indicative to how much stock must be ordered and both that and market penetration are of utmost importance for financial performance. However, emerging markets are difficult to predict as they are categorized by large amounts of growth. This means demand is hard to forecast and therefore inventory supply as well. The connection between emerging market penetration and inventory supply are bridged by several factors such as advanced inventory management, technologies and holding costs. So while the market penetration may dictate how much supply is needed other factors must dictate how much inventory it is prudent to keep. Understanding market penetration for an emerging market is more difficult due to the lack of established competitors and similar products. Emerging markets are susceptible to large companies and are sought after by globalized businesses due to the increase in disposable income the average person will have and weak local competitors. The weakness of local competitors is due to their poor customer service and limit in resources as they don't have the capital and reach that large corporations have. The four big emerging markets are Brazil, Russia, India and China as they were the fastest to recover after the 2008/2009 economic crisis. These markets are untapped potential for revenue and a good spot for globalization for dominant company's. Large market penetration is the key to fully tapping these markets.

== Purpose ==
As a strategy, market penetration is used when the business seeks to increase sales growth of its existing products or services to its existing markets in order to gain a higher market share. This strategy is often used during the early stages of the business or before it enters the market, in order to prove the market existence and show market size for its products or services, also to gain an understanding to the number of competitors and how well they are doing. Hence, the business can decide on either it is a good to enter their target market or not, and how it can make its products or services more attractive to consumers than its competitors. During the operation of the business, if the sales are decreasing or flatlining comparing to previous years, then it is also appropriate to apply market penetration strategy to seek for opportunities to increase sales. Therefore, it is unnecessary to this strategy if the sales are increasing. However, it is exceptional if the sales growth trend shows the gross increase but is much less significant comparing to its competitors, because this could indicate the business's market share is actually shrinking, then this strategy can be a good approach to try regain its market share.

To achieve the goal of higher market share, the primary idea is that the business has to either increase sales volume to their existing customers by encouraging for more frequent or greater usages, or expanding the population size of customers in the current market by attracting potential new customers to buy its goods or services. Since the market penetration strategy is conducted based on established capabilities and characteristics of the business and the market, therefore it contains the lowest risk out of the four strategies in Ansoff's product-market growth matrix. Hence, a business should give special consideration to conducts it, since this strategy is important for the evaluation work on the intended market and the existing businesses within this market. Especially when the business or product or service is about to enter the market or during its initial stage, and when it is not comfortable with risk-taking, or the owners of the business do not intend or not in a position to invest heavily into it. The amount of risk involved with each of the four types of Ansoff's strategies increases from market penetration to market development, to production development, to diversification. Because the both market and product development involve with one aspect of new developments, changes, and innovation. The diversification strategy is with most risk because the business is growing into both a new market and product, and thus contains with most uncertainties.

Market penetration is not only a strategy but also a measurement (in percentage) for popularity of a brand or a product in the category, in other words, the number of customers in the market that buys from a brand or product.

== Strategies ==
=== Price adjustments ===
One of the common market penetration strategies is to lower the products' prices. Businesses aim to generate more sales volume by increasing the number of products purchased by putting on lower prices (price competition) for consumers comparing to the alternative goods. Companies may alternatively pursue strategies of higher prices depending on the demand elasticity of the product, in the hope that it will generate an increased sales volume and result in higher market penetration.

==== Penetration pricing ====
Penetration pricing is a marketing technique which is used to gain market share by selling a new product for a price that is significantly lower than its competitors. The company begins to raise the price of the product once it has achieved a large customer base and market share. Penetration pricing is frequently used by network provider and cable or satellite services companies. Many of the providers will initially offer an unbeatable price to attract customers into switching to their service and after the discount period has ended, the price increases dramatically and some customers will be forced to stay with the provider because of contract issues.

Penetration pricing benefits from the influence of word-of-mouth advertising, allowing customers to spread the words of how affordable the products are prior to business increasing the prices. It will also discourage and disadvantage competitors who are not willing to undersell and losing sales to others. However, businesses have to ensure they have enough capital to stay in surplus before the price is raised up again.

=== Increased promotion ===
Businesses can also increase their market penetration by offering promotions to customers. A promotion is a strategy often linked with pricing, used to raise awareness of the brand and generate profit to maximise their market share.

=== More distribution channels ===
A distribution channel is the connection between businesses and intermediaries before a good or service is purchased by the consumers. Distribution can also contribute to sales volumes for businesses. It can increase consumer awareness, change the strategies of competitors and alter the consumer's perception of the product and the brand, and is another method to increase market penetration.

=== Product improvements ===
Product management is crucial to a high market penetration in the targeted market and by improving the quality of products, businesses are able to attract and out-quality the competitors' products to match customers' requirements and eventually lead to more sales made. Product improvements can be utilised to create new interests in a declining product, for example by changing the design of the packaging or material/ingredients.

=== Market development ===
Market development aims at non-buying shoppers in targeted markets and new customers in order to maximise the potential market. Before developing a new market, companies should consider all the risks associated with the decision including its profitability. If a company is confident about their products, believes in their strengths, and is enticing to new consumers, then market development is a suitable strategy for the business.

== Construction ==
Market penetration can be defined as the proportion of people in the target who bought (at least once in the period) a specific brand or a category of goods. Two key measures of a product's 'popularity' are penetration rate and penetration share. The penetration rate (also called penetration, brand penetration or market penetration as appropriate) is the percentage of the relevant population that has purchased a given brand or category at least once in the time period under study. A brand's penetration share, in contrast to penetration rate, is determined by comparing that brand's customer population to the number of customers for its category in the relevant market as a whole. Here again, to be considered a customer, one must have purchased the brand or category at least once during the period.
