= Inorganic growth =

Business strategy

Inorganic growth is the rate of growth of business, sales expansion etc. by increasing output and business reach by acquiring new businesses by way of mergers, acquisitions and take-overs. This kind of growth also takes place due to government directives, leading to enhancement of business in some identified priority sector/area. The inorganic growth rate also factors in the impact of foreign exchange movements or performance of other economies.

As opposed to the organic growth, this kind of growth is affected to a great extent by exogenous factors. It is also a faster way for companies to grow compared with organic growth (where the main focus is productivity enhancement and cost reduction).

After a merger, the business benefits of mergers and acquisitions (M&A) to fuel inorganic growth prove to be difficult to realise. Several risks are introduced by this method of inorganic growth – a clash in company cultures and the risk of losing customers are some of the main issues. In contrast, with organic growth, a business has better control over its growth by planning and deploying more easily accessible internal resources

This term is usually related with financial sectors showing expanding business and profits.
