= Ansoff matrix =

Strategic planning tool

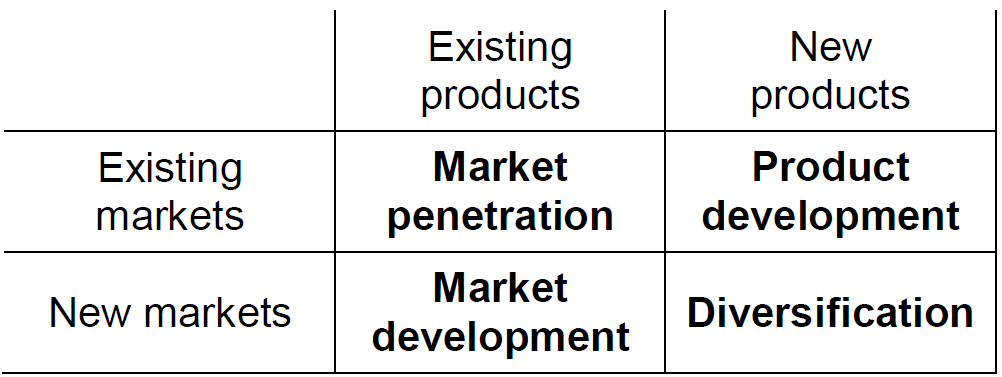
The Ansoff matrix compares market penetration, product development, market development and diversification.

The Ansoff matrix is a strategic planning tool that provides a framework to help executives, senior managers, and marketers devise strategies for future business growth. It is named after Russian American Igor Ansoff, an applied mathematician and business manager, who created the concept.

== Growth strategies ==
Ansoff, in his 1957 paper, "Strategies for Diversification", provided a definition for product-market strategy as "a joint statement of a product line and the corresponding set of missions which the products are designed to fulfill". He describes four growth alternatives for growing an organization in existing or new markets, with existing or new products. Each alternative poses differing levels of risk for an organization.

=== Market penetration ===
Market penetration is a growth strategy where an organization aims to expand using its existing offerings (products and services) within current markets. In simpler terms, it seeks to increase its market share in the existing market landscape. It involves attracting new customers, retaining existing ones, or acquiring competitors to capture more of the existing market. To achieve increased sales for its current products, the company adopts more assertive promotion and distribution strategies.

This can be accomplished by:

- Adjusting pricing strategies to boost sales volumes.
- Increasing marketing and promotion efforts to attract new customers.
- Acquiring competitors to increase market share.
- Improving product quality to encourage repeat purchase.

Market penetration is generally considered the least risky of the four options, as it leverages the company's established strengths and market knowledge.

=== Market development ===
In a market development strategy, an organization tries to expand into new markets, geographies or countries. It does not require significant investment in R&D or product development and the management team can leverage existing products and take them to a different market.

This can be accomplished by:

- Targeting different customer segments: Explore beyond current customer base, for instance, consider industrial buyers if product was previously sold to households.
- Venturing into new areas or regions: Identify untapped regions within the country by expanding geographically.
- Exploring foreign markets: Enter international markets to reach new customers in new geographies.

This strategy is moderately risky by virtue of the fact that they're selling a products with proven strategies.

=== Product development ===
In a product development strategy, a company tries to create new products and services targeted at its existing markets to achieve growth. This strategy tries to leverage an existing brand's reputation and customer loyalty by offering them new products and services that address evolving needs or capitalize on new trends. To implement a product development strategy well, businesses should:

- Invest in research and development to create products that address changing customer needs.
- Gathering customer feedback for designing products and services with their desired features.
- Collaborate with suppliers and distributors, to ensure a smooth and efficient supply chain.
- Develop a strong value proposition and marketing strategies to generate interest and demand.

Product development is considered riskier than market penetration and a similar risk as market development.

=== Diversification ===
In diversification an organization tries to grow its market share by introducing new offerings in new markets. Unlike other strategies that build upon existing strengths, diversification requires venturing into uncharted territory, where the organization may have little or no prior experience. It is considered the riskiest strategy because it requires both product and market development. Introducing any product into a new market involves a lot of research. If the new product does not appeal to the local tastes, the business can face heavy loss, hence this approach is more suitable for large multinational corporations.

Types of diversification can broadly be categorized as:

- Concentric diversification: Introducing a similar product within the existing product line with the purpose of leveraging existing expertise to expand the product range.
- Horizontal diversification: Introducing an unrelated new product alongside existing offerings with the objective of reaching new customer segments and reducing dependence on a single category.
- Conglomerate diversification: Entering entirely different markets with unrelated products. Typically done to achieve financial stability by diversifying across diverse industries.

== Uses ==
The Ansoff matrix is a useful tool for organizations wanting to identify and explore their growth options. Although the risk varies between quadrants, with diversification being the riskiest, it can be argued that if an organization diversifies its offering successfully into multiple unrelated markets then, in fact, its overall portfolio risk is lowered.

An approach to personal career development has also been developed using the matrix, with expert development (same industry, same skills) corresponding to market penetration, industry transfer to market development, functional skill development matching to product development and retraining matching to diversification.

== Criticisms ==
=== Isolation challenges ===
Used by itself, the Ansoff matrix could be misleading. It does not take into account the activities of competitors and the ability for competitors to counter moves into other industries. It also fails to consider the challenges and risks of changes to business-as-usual activities. An organization hoping to move into new markets or create new products (or both) must consider whether they possess transferable skills, flexible structures, and agreeable stakeholders.

=== Logical consistency challenges ===
The logic of the Ansoff matrix has been questioned. The logical issues pertain to interpretations about newness. If one assumes a new product really is new to the firm, in many cases a new product will simultaneously take the firm into a new, unfamiliar market. In that case, one of the Ansoff quadrants, diversification, is redundant. Alternatively, if a new product does not necessarily take the firm into a new market, then the combination of new products into new markets does not always equate to diversification, in the sense of venturing into a completely unknown business.

== See also ==
- Business model
- Business triage
- First-mover advantage
- Marketing
- Market segmentation
