= Physics First =

American educational program

Physics First is an educational program in the United States, that teaches a basic physics course in the ninth grade (usually 14-year-olds), rather than the biology course which is more standard in public schools. This course relies on the limited math skills that the students have from pre-algebra and algebra I. With these skills students study a broad subset of the introductory physics canon with an emphasis on topics which can be experienced kinesthetically or without deep mathematical reasoning. Furthermore, teaching physics first is better suited for English Language Learners, who would be overwhelmed by the substantial vocabulary requirements of Biology.

Physics First began as an organized movement among educators around 1990, and has been slowly catching on throughout the United States. The most prominent movement championing Physics First is Leon Lederman's ARISE (American Renaissance in Science Education).

Many proponents of Physics First argue that turning this order around lays the foundations for better understanding of chemistry, which in turn will lead to more comprehension of biology. Due to the tangible nature of most introductory physics experiments, Physics First also lends itself well to an introduction to inquiry-based science education, where students are encouraged to probe the workings of the world in which they live.

The majority of high schools which have implemented "physics first" do so by way of offering two separate classes, at two separate levels: simple physics concepts in 9th grade, followed by more advanced physics courses in 11th or 12th grade. In schools with this curriculum, nearly all 9th grade students take a "Physical Science", or "Introduction to Physics Concepts" course. These courses focus on concepts that can be studied with skills from pre-algebra and algebra I. With these ideas in place, students then can be exposed to ideas with more physics related content in chemistry, and other science electives. After this, students are then encouraged to take an 11th or 12th grade course in physics, which does use more advanced math, including vectors, geometry, and more involved algebra.

There is a large overlap between the Physics First movement, and the movement towards teaching conceptual physics - teaching physics in a way that emphasizes a strong understanding of physical principles over problem-solving ability.

== Criticism ==
American public schools traditionally teach biology in the first year of high school, chemistry in the second, and physics in the third. The belief is that this order is more accessible, largely because biology can be taught with less mathematics, and will do the most toward providing some scientific literacy for the largest number of students.

In addition, many scientists and educators argue that freshmen do not have an adequate background in mathematics to be able to fully comprehend a complete physics curriculum, and that therefore quality of a physics education is lost. While physics requires knowledge of vectors and some basic trigonometry, many students in the Physics First program take the course in conjunction with geometry. They suggest that instead students first take biology and chemistry which are less mathematics-intensive so that by the time they are in their junior year, students will be advanced enough in mathematics with either an algebra 2 or pre-calculus education to be able to fully grasp the concepts presented in physics. Some argue this even further, saying that at least calculus should be a prerequisite for physics.

Others point out that, for example, secondary school students will never study the advanced physics that underlies chemistry in the first place. "[I]nclined planes (frictionless or not) didn't come up in ... high school chemistry class ... and the same can be said for some of the chemistry that really makes sense of biological phenomena." For physics to be relevant to a chemistry course, students have to develop a truly fundamental understanding of the concepts of energy, force, and matter, beyond the context of specific applications like the inclined plane.
