= Product Development and Management Association =

American nonprofit professional society

- Founded: 1976
- Type: Professional Association
- Region served: Worldwide
- Method: Certification, industry standards, conferences, publications
- Key people: Susan Penta (Chair); Greg Coticchia (Vice-Chair); Marlon Hernandez (Secretary/Treasurer); Eric Ewald (Executive Director)
- Website: www.pdma.org

The Product Development and Management Association (PDMA) is an American nonprofit professional society that organizes and publishes information about new product development.

Founded in 1976, they currently have about 3500 members worldwide, with 22 chapters in the United States and 16 affiliates in other parts of the world, including India.

PDMA operates a training program leading to the New Product Development Professional (NPDP) certification.

They hold an annual conference that gives an opportunity for professional exchange, and they offer a wide range of publications, including:

- The bimonthly Journal of Product Innovation Management (JPIM)
- Visions Magazine
- PDMA Handbook of New Product Development.
- further books on product development topics

The JPIM journal, published by Wiley-Blackwell and held in numerous university libraries, ranked 19 out of 40 marketing journals that were evaluated for their usefulness in a 2002 study.
