= New product development =

Complete process of bringing a new product to market

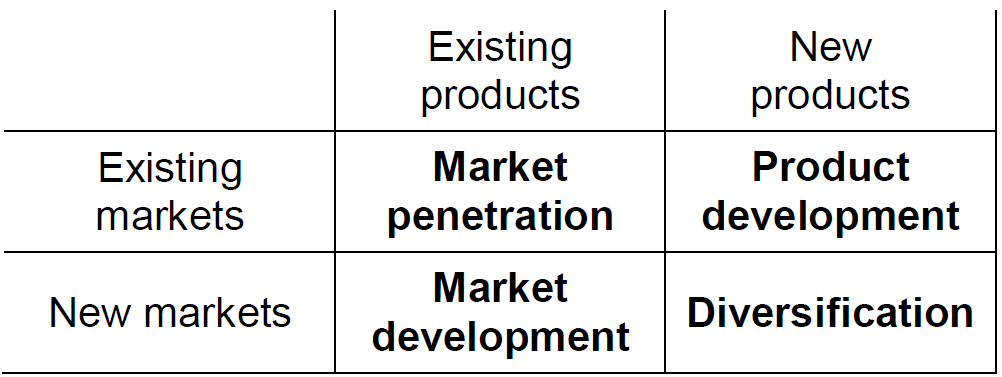
The Ansoff matrix compares market penetration, product development, market development and diversification.

In business and engineering, new product development (NPD) or simply product development is the complete process of bringing a new product to market. Product development also includes renewing an existing product and introducing a product into a new market. New product development is the realization of a market opportunity by making a product available for purchase. The products developed by a commercial organization provide the means to generate income. A central aspect of NPD is product design.

Many technology-intensive organizations exploit technological innovation in a rapidly changing consumer market. A product can be a tangible asset or good or intangible services or user experiences. NPD requires an understanding of customer needs and wants, the competitive environment, and the nature of the market.

Cost, time, and quality are the main variables that drive customer needs. Aiming at these three variables, innovative companies develop continuous practices and strategies to better satisfy customer requirements and to increase their own market share by regular development of new products. There are many uncertainties and challenges which companies must face throughout the process.

== Overview ==
New product development requires an understanding of customer needs and wants, the competitive environment, and the nature of the market.

Cost, time, and quality are the main variables that drive customer needs. Product pricing involves achieving a balance between setting a price that will attract customer interest and ensuring an acceptable level of return on the costs and time involved in developing the product.

== Process structure ==
The product development process typically consists of several activities that firms employ in the complex process of delivering new products to the market. A process management approach is used to provide a structure. Product development often overlaps much with the engineering design process, particularly if the new product being developed involves application of math and/or science. Every new product will pass through a series of stages/phases, including ideation among other aspects of design, as well as manufacturing and market introduction. In highly complex engineered products (e.g. aircraft, automotive, machinery), the NPD process can be likewise complex regarding management of personnel, milestones, and deliverables. Such projects typically use an integrated product team approach. The process for managing large-scale complex engineering products is much slower (often 10-plus years) than that deployed for many types of consumer goods.

The development process is articulated and broken down in many different ways, often including the following phases/stages:

PHASE 1. Fuzzy front-end (FFE) is the set of activities employed before the more formal and well-defined requirements specification is completed. Requirements speaks to what the product should do or have, at varying degrees of specificity, in order to meet the perceived market or business need

The fuzzy front end (FFE) is the messy "getting started" period of new product engineering development processes. It is also referred to as the "Front End of Innovation", or "Idea Management".

It is in the front end where the organization formulates a concept of the product to be developed and decides whether or not to invest resources in the further development of an idea. It is the phase between first consideration of an opportunity and when it is judged ready to enter the structured development process (Kim and Wilemon, 2007; Koen et al., 2001). It includes all activities from the search for new opportunities through the formation of a germ of an idea to the development of a precise concept. The Fuzzy Front End phase ends when an organization approves and begins formal development of the concept.

Although the fuzzy front end may not be an expensive part of product development, it can consume 50% of development time (see Chapter 3 of the Smith and Reinertsen reference below), and it is where major commitments are typically made involving time, money, and the product's nature, thus setting the course for the entire project and final end product. Consequently, this phase should be considered as an essential part of development rather than something that happens "before development", and its cycle time should be included in the total development cycle time.

Koen et al. (2001) distinguish five different front-end elements (not necessarily in a particular order):

1. Opportunity Identification
2. Opportunity Analysis
3. Idea Genesis
4. Idea Selection
5. Idea and Technology Development

The first element is opportunity identification. In this element, large or incremental business and technological opportunities are identified in a more or less structured way. Using the guidelines established here, resources will eventually be allocated to new projects, leading to a structured NPPD (New Product & Process Development) strategy.

The second element is opportunity analysis. It is conducted to translate the identified opportunities into implications for the business and the technology-specific context of the company. At this stage, extensive efforts may be made to align ideas with target customer groups and conduct market studies and/or technical trials and research.

The third element is idea genesis, which is described as an evolutionary and iterative process that progresses from the birth of an opportunity to its maturation into a tangible idea. The idea genesis process can be carried out internally or may arise from external inputs, such as a supplier offering a new material or technology, or a customer making an unusual request.

The fourth element is idea selection. Its purpose is to determine whether an idea should be pursued by analyzing its potential business value.

The fifth element is the idea and technology development. During this part of the front-end, the business case is developed based on estimates of the total available market, customer needs, investment requirements, competition analysis and project uncertainty. Some organizations consider this to be the first stage of the NPPD process (i.e., Stage 0).

A universally acceptable definition for Fuzzy Front End or a dominant framework has not been developed so far. In a glossary by the Product Development and Management Association, it is mentioned that the fuzzy front end generally consists of three tasks: strategic planning, idea generation, and pre-technical evaluation. These activities are often chaotic, unpredictable, and unstructured. In comparison, the subsequent new product development process is typically structured, predictable, and formal. The term fuzzy front end was first popularized by Smith and Reinertsen (1991).R.G. Cooper (1988) it describes the early stages of NPPD as a four-step process in which ideas are generated (I), subjected to a preliminary technical and market assessment (II) and merged to coherent product concepts (III) which are finally judged for their fit with existing product strategies and portfolios (IV).

PHASE 2: Product design is the development of both the high-level and detailed-level design of the product: which turns the what of the requirements into a specific how this particular product will meet those requirements. This typically has the most overlap with the engineering design process, but can also include industrial design and even purely aesthetic aspects of design. On the marketing and planning side, this phase ends at pre-commercialization analysis stage.

PHASE 3: Product implementation often refers to later stages of detailed engineering design (e.g. refining mechanical or electrical hardware, or software, or goods or other product forms), as well as test process that may be used to validate that the prototype actually meets all design specifications that were established.

PHASE 4: Fuzzy back-end or commercialization phase represent the action steps where the production and market launch occur.

The front-end marketing phases have been very well researched, with valuable models proposed. Peter Koen et al. provides a five-step front-end activity called front-end innovation: opportunity identification, opportunity analysis, idea genesis, idea selection, and idea and technology development. He also includes an engine in the middle of the five front-end stages and the possible outside barriers that can influence the process outcome. The engine represents the management driving the activities described. The front end of the innovation is the greatest area of weakness in the NPD process. This is mainly because the FFE is often chaotic, unpredictable and unstructured. Engineering design is the process whereby a technical solution is developed iteratively to solve a given problem.

The design stage is very important because at this stage most of the product life cycle costs are incurred. Previous research shows that 70–80% of the final product quality and 70% of the product entire life-cycle cost are determined in the product design phase, therefore the design-manufacturing interface represent the greatest opportunity for cost reduction. Design projects last from a few weeks to three years with an average of one year. Design and commercialization phases usually start with a very early collaboration. When the concept design is finished it will be sent to a manufacturing plant for prototyping, developing a Concurrent Engineering approach by implementing practices such as QFD, DFM/DFA and more. The output of the design (engineering) is a set of product and process specifications – mostly in the form of drawings, and the output of manufacturing is the product ready for sale. Basically, the design team will develop drawings with technical specifications representing the future product, and will send it to the manufacturing plant to be executed. Solving product/process fit problems is of high priority in information communication design because 90% of the development effort must be scrapped if any changes are made after the release to manufacturing.

== Conceptual models ==
Conceptual models have been designed in order to facilitate a smooth product development process.

Booz, Allen and Hamilton Model: One of the first developed models that companies still use in the NPD process is the Booz, Allen and Hamilton (BAH) Model, first laid out in the 1968 book Management of New Products published by Booz-Allen & Hamilton Inc. and later revised in 1982 for the book New Products Management for the 1980s at the recommendation of Carl Bochmann. This is the best-known model because it underlies the NPD systems that have been put forward later. This model represents the foundation of all the other models that have been developed afterwards. Significant work has been conducted in order to propose better models, but in fact these models can be easily linked to the BAH model. The seven steps of the BAH model are: new product strategy, idea generation, screening and evaluation, business analysis, development, testing, and commercialization.

Exploratory product development model (ExPD): Exploratory product development, which often goes by the acronym ExPD, is an emerging approach to new product development. Consultants Mary Drotar and Kathy Morrissey first introduced ExPD at the 2015 Product Development and Management Association annual meeting and later outlined their approach in the Product Development and Management Association's magazine Visions.

In 2015, Drotar and Morrissey's firm Strategy2Market received the trademark on the term "Exploratory PD". Rather than going through a set of discrete phases, like the phase-gate process, this exploratory product development process allows organizations to adapt to a landscape of shifting market circumstances and uncertainty by using a more flexible and adaptable product development process for both hardware and software.

Where the traditional phase-gate approach works best in a stable market environment, ExPD is more suitable for product development in markets that are unstable and less predictable. Unstable and unpredictable markets cause uncertainty and risk in product development. Many factors contribute to the outcome of a project, and ExPD works on the assumption that the ones that the product team doesn't know enough about or are unaware of are the factors that create uncertainty and risk.

The primary goal of ExPD is to reduce uncertainty and risk by reducing the unknown. When organizations adapt quickly to the changing environment (market, technology, regulations, globalization, etc.), they reduce uncertainty and risk, which leads to product success. ExPD is described as a two-pronged, integrated systems approach. Drotar and Morrissey state that product development is complex and needs to be managed as a system, integrating essential elements: strategy, portfolio management, organization/teams/culture, metrics, market/customer understanding, and process.

Drotar and Morrissey have published two books on ExPD. The first, Exploratory Product Development: Executive Version: Adaptable Product Development in a Changing World, was published as an e-book on December 3, 2018. On September 8, 2022, Drotar and Morrissey published their second book, "Learn & Adapt: ExPD An Adaptive Product Development Process for Rapid Innovation and Risk Reduction, which also highlights their process. The book has three sections: Overview of ExPD, How to Do It, and Adaptive Practices that Support ExPD. According to Kirkus, "the (approach the) authors advocate is outwardly focused and premised on being adaptable enough to develop new competencies and create new models as complex situations evolve." Kirkus summarizes the text as "complex and visually stimulating; a serious blueprint for serious strategists."

IDEO approach. The concept adopted by IDEO, a design and consulting firm, is one of the most researched processes in regard to new product development and is a five-step procedure. These steps are listed in chronological order:

1. Understand and observe the market, the client, the technology, and the limitations of the problem;
2. Synthesize the information collected at the first step;
3. Visualise new customers using the product;
4. Prototype, evaluate and improve the concept;
5. Implementation of design changes, which are associated with more technologically advanced procedures and therefore will require more time.

Lean start-up approach: Lean startup is a methodology for developing businesses and products that aims to shorten product development cycles and rapidly discover if a proposed business model is viable; this is achieved by adopting a combination of business-hypothesis-driven experimentation, iterative product releases, and validated learning. Lean startup emphasizes customer feedback over intuition and flexibility over planning. This methodology enables recovery from failures more often than traditional ways of product development.

Stage-Gate model: “Stage-Gate Process: A widely employed product development process that divides the effort into distinct time-sequenced stages separated by management decision gates. Multifunctional teams must successfully complete a prescribed set of related cross-functional tasks in each stage prior to obtaining management approval to proceed to the next stage of product development. The framework of the Stage-Gate™ process includes workflow and decision-flow paths and defines the supporting systems and practices necessary to ensure the process's ongoing smooth operation. Source:

(Note: Stage-Gate^{®} is a registered trademark owned and protected by Stage-Gate Inc.) A pioneer in the field of management of innovation and NPD is Robert G. Cooper. Since 1975, Cooper had conducted significant work in the field of management of innovation and NPD. The Stage-Gate model, developed in the 1980s, was proposed as a new tool for managing new product development processes. This was mainly applied to physical products as opposed to software or services. The 2010 APQC benchmarking study reveals that 88% of U.S. businesses employ a Stage-Gate system to manage new products, from idea to launch. In return, the companies that adopt this system are reported to receive benefits such as improved teamwork, improved success rates, earlier detection of failure, a better launch, and even shorter cycle times – reduced by about 30%. These findings highlight the importance of the Stage-Gate model in the area of new product development.

The Stage-Gate model for major new products consists of five stages and five gates. The stages are:

1. Ideation or Discovery
2. Stage 1: Concept or Scoping
3. Stage 2: Build Business Case
4. Stage 3: Development
5. Stage 4: Testing & Validation
6. Stage 5: Launch (commercialization)

These activities yield essential information to make a Go/No-Go to Development decision. These decisions represent the Gates in the Stage-Gate model.

== Management ==
The following are types of new product development management structures:

=== Customer-centric product development ===
Customer-centric new product development focuses on finding new ways to solve customer problems and create more customer-satisfying experiences. Companies often rely on technology, but real success comes from understanding customer needs and values. The most successful companies are the ones that differentiated from others, solve major customer problems, offer a compelling customer value proposition, and engage customers directly, and systematically.

=== Systematic product development ===
Systematic new product development focuses on creating a process that allows for the collection, review, and evaluation of new product ideas.

Having a way in which employees, suppliers, distributors, and dealers become involved in finding and developing new products is important to a company's success. Co-ordinated (and often early) involvement of suppliers in new product development has been seen as productive and generally advocated since the 1980s. Early supplier involvement (ESI) is generally seen as cost-reducing, although account also needs to be taken of the danger of being locked into a supplier who can press for higher prices. The Chartered Institute of Procurement & Supply sets out four ESI phases:

1. Concept stage: initial design and sales forecasting
2. Specification of supply requirements with supplier input, quantifying orders and safety stock requirements, and confirming supplier selection
3. Working with the supplier on quality control, delivery standards and investment costs
4. Adopting a manufacturing methodology and securing efficiencies.

Cost transparency, backed by appropriate contract terms and supplier audit requirements, can help a business to avoid being disadvantaged by undue supplier pressure.

Other examples of collaborative product development work include international military collaboration in the development of new weapons systems, and in the ICT sector, where Bruce et al. observe that collaboration among ICT companies "is the preferred route for product development".

It is also important for companies to have a process in place for monitoring competitors and their products so that they can stay ahead of them.

==== Innovation management ====
In order to successfully manage the new product development process, companies must have an innovation management system in place. This system helps to ensure that all aspects of new product development are taken into account and that the company is able to track and assess the progress of new products. An innovation manager is a senior person appointed to be responsible for implementing and managing such a system. The innovation management system should also help to foster a culture of innovation within the company, which can help to increase the chances of success for new products. Marketing writers Hyman and Wilkins argue that a company's rate of product innovation should fit between the extremes of being so rapid that "its core range decays" and so slow that its product range "become[s] obsolete". Managers are responsible for ensuring that all aspects of new product development are taken into account and that the company is able to track and assess the progress of new products.

===== Cross-functional innovation management committee =====
A cross-functional innovation management committee is a team of individuals from different company departments, including marketing, engineering, design, manufacturing, and research and development, who are responsible for overseeing and managing the new product development process. This committee helps to ensure that all aspects of new product development are taken into account and that the company is able to track and assess the progress of new products. Companies may get a better overall picture of new product development by putting together a cross-functional team, which can help generate fresh ideas and give assistance in evaluating them.

=== Other techniques ===
In addition, companies can use virtual product development to help reduce costs. This process uses collaboration technology to remove the need for co-located teams, which can result in significant cost savings such as a reduction in G&A (general & administrative) overhead costs of consulting firms.

Another way to reduce the cost of new product development is through the use of 24-hour development cycles. This approach allows companies to develop products more quickly and at a lower cost. By using a 24-hour cycle, companies can shorten the time it takes to get a product to market, which can give them a competitive advantage and capability that can be extremely useful in cases where there is a sudden change in market conditions or customer needs.

=== Use in turbulent times ===
In difficult economic times, it is even more important for companies to focus on innovation and new product development. Oftentimes, such situations result in a short-sighted focus on cost-cutting and a reduction in spending on new products. However, companies that are able to innovate and create new products will be better positioned for the future.

Economic downturns may lead companies to place greater emphasis on new product development as they look for ways to meet changing customer needs and tastes. Methods such as virtual product development and 24-hour development cycles may help reduce development costs.

== Roles ==
There are many different roles in a product development team: below is a list of some of the more common ones:

Product Development Roles and Responsibilities
Function	Roles
Product Management	Chief Product Officer (CPO); Director of Product Management; Product Owner; Product Manager
User Experience (UX)	Director of User Experience; UX Designer; UI Designer; Product Designer
Product Analytics	Product Analyst; Business Analyst; Market Researcher
Product Marketing	Chief Marketing Officer (CMO); Director of Marketing; Graphic Designer
Conceptual Design	Ideation Facilitator; Conceptual Designer
Engineering	Lead Engineer; Full Stack Developer; Technical Lead; Electrical Engineer; Embedded Systems Engineer; Mechanical Design Engineer; Application Developers

== Related fields ==
- Brand management
- Engineering
- Industrial design
- Marketing
- Product design
- Product management

== See also ==
- Choice modelling
- Commercialization
- Conceptual economy
- End user
- Engineering information management
- Ideation (creative process)
- Industrial design
- Innovation
- Market penetration
- Open innovation
- Packaging
- Pro-innovation bias
- Product design
- Product lifecycle
- Research and development
- Requirements management
- Social design
- Soft launch
