= The Conceptual Framework =

The Conceptual Framework is a linked set of agencies that assist in the critical analysis of art. They can be discussed as separate entities or by connecting them to meta-frames that are cultural, structural, subjective, and postmodern.

== Overview ==
The four agencies encompass the questions of "who, what, when, where and why", and are as follows:

1. Artist – the role of the artist where the art work is explored as the product of practitioners such as artists, artisans, craftspeople, architects and designers. The artist can be seen as an individual or as a group or movement.
2. Audience – the role and value of the audience. The concept of audience can be evaluated historically or critically. The audience may be specific such as art historians or critics, or other members of the public such as students, teachers, art buyers, etc. Or the audience may be abstract as when notions of "viewing" and "authorship" come into it. Artworks themselves are static, but the audience and their interpretation changes over time.
3. Artwork – artworks as real objects. This includes paintings, sculpture, architecture, design, performance art, and genres of these, as well as presentations of an artist's personal and cultural reflections. Additionally, there exists the opportunity for symbolic interpretations and modern reinterpretations.
4. World – how interests "in the world" are represented in the art. This includes Socio-political aspects such as class, ideologies, etc.; experiences of the world, personal to the artist or experienced by the collective; interests of the art world—movements, styles, innovations, pressures, technology and more.?

== Art frames ==
"Art frames" are "meta-frames" which are generally associated with the conceptual framework and take the conceptual framework further. They include the structural, subjective, postmodern and cultural "frame" where art is understood as "text" and language. In this way, art itself becomes analytical and self-aware.

The subjective frame comprises mainly feelings and emotions expressed, and of audience response or interpretation.

The structural frame refers to physical techniques and principles applied to the artwork, such as mediums, overall structure, facture and the use of symbols. (An example of facture is the work of French artist Daniel Buren and the work of wrapper Christo.)

The cultural frame examines the influence of differing aspects of culture upon the artwork, such as race or class issues, religion or taste.

The postmodern frame does not apply only to postmodern artworks, but as an attitude to artworks in general. Features of the postmodern frame include traditionally non-artistic aspects, such as appropriation, and the use of humour and irony.

These frames can be applied in order to direct or analyse artworks in addition to the conceptual framework.
