= Business triage =

Business triage is a decision-making system that provides a framework for business decision making, outcome goal prioritization, and resource allocation in many business environments. Business triage involves categorizing desired outcomes and goals and the processes that support them based on their relative importance to achieving a stated measurable goal or outcome. Using the same triage categories employed by military medical and disaster medical services, business processes are categorized as essential/critical (red) important/urgent (yellow), or optional/supportive (green).

In a business triage model, resources are allocated based on the outcome/goal and process category/rank, with resources first dedicated to red, then yellow, and finally green categories. In the event that resources become limited, resources are first withheld from green, then yellow categories. Resources are only withheld from red categories if failure to achieve outcomes/goals is acceptable.

== History ==
First described in the late 1990s, business triage grew out of the need for a reproducible method for the allocation of limited resources (especially money) by start-up and expanding businesses. The concepts utilized in business triage were drawn from the real-world experience of managing limited resources in the high-stakes environments of battlefields and disaster scenes (medical triage). Process analysis methods similar to those used by information technology professionals and later business continuity professionals were added to better identify the processes that support the desired outcomes and goals.

== Application and technique ==
The application of business triage to businesses requires a detailed examination of the desired outcomes and goals for the business in question. Internal outcomes and goals such as building maintenance and employee safety must be included in the inventory along with the more obvious external outcomes and goals such as product sales and delivery of services to the end customer. The more detailed this examination, the more accurate and helpful the subsequent use of resources will be.

Once the internal and external outcomes and goals examination is complete, these must be categorized based on their relationship to the core mission and values of the company. Outcomes and goals are categorized into three prioritised categories.

Within each category, the desired outcomes and goals are ranked based on the "threat" presented to the company if the outcome or goal is not achieved and the level of "outrage" that will occur should the threat be realized. This "threat" and "outrage" relationship is calculated as a PIVOT score where:

Threat = Probability × (Impact + Vulnerability)

PIVOT Score = (Threat)^{Outrage}

The greater the PIVOT Score, the higher the relative priority within the triage category.

After outcomes and goals are triaged, the processes that support each outcome or goal are triaged according to the same relationships described above. Processes are first categorized with the same categories as above.

Again, within each category the processes for each outcome are ranked based on their respective PIVOT Score with the higher relative priority within a triage category given to the processes with the greater PIVOT Score.

Available resources, including money, materials, and personnel are allocated based on the relative triage and ranking of the desired outcome/goal to the processes that contribute to achieving that outcome/goal, with the highest ranking process receiving resources before lower ranking processes within each outcome/goal grouping.
