= Conceptual economy =

Economical terminology

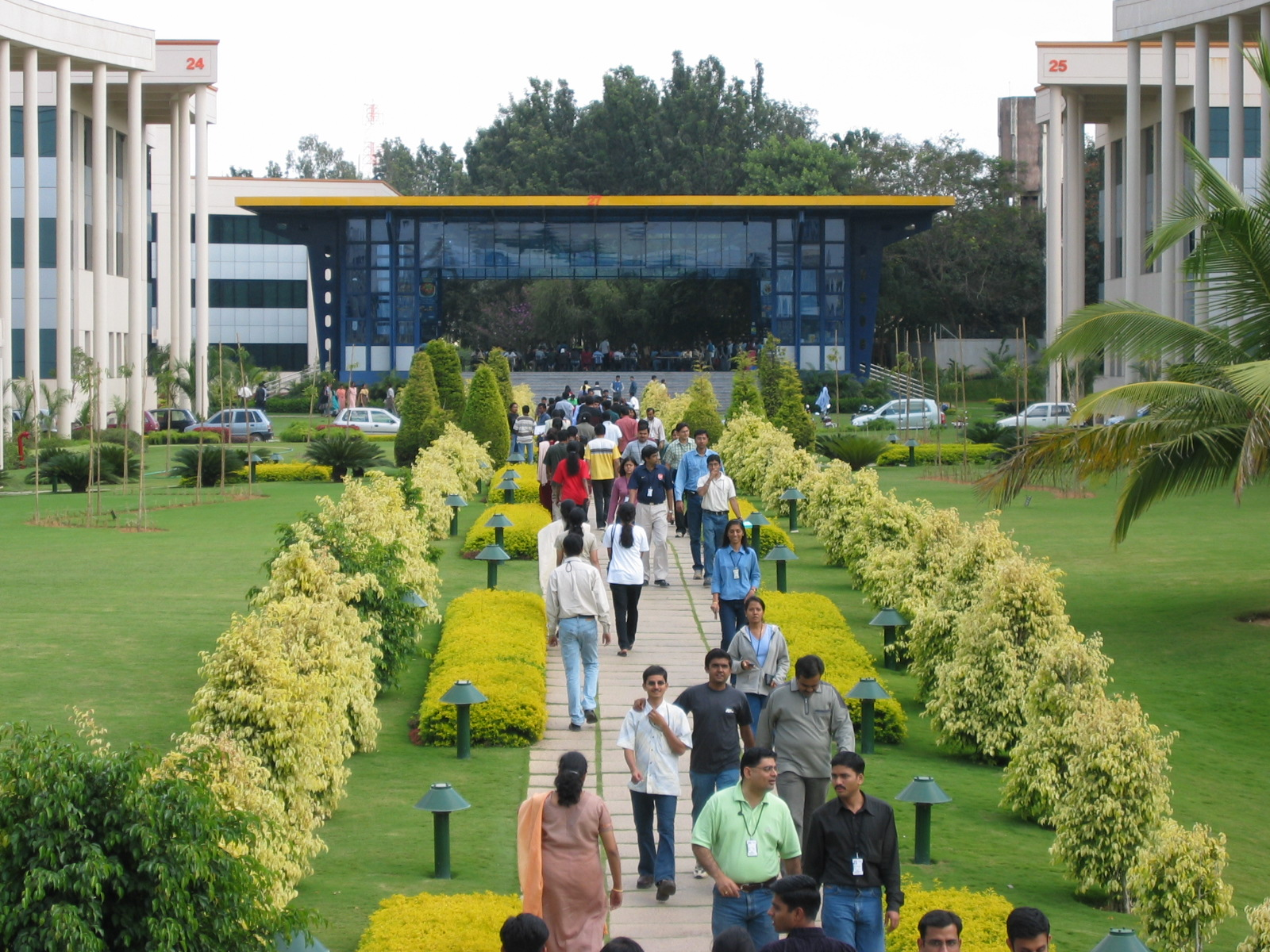
Infosys Bangalore, driving outsourcing to India

Conceptual economy is a term describing the contribution of creativity, innovation, and design skills to economic competitiveness, especially in the global context.

== History and background ==
Alan Greenspan, former chairman of the Federal Reserve Board, recognized the role of conceptual output as early as 1997 in a speech at the University of Connecticut when he said "The growth of the conceptual component of output has brought with it accelerating demands for workers who are equipped not simply with technical know-how, but with the ability to create, analyze, and transform information and to interact effectively with others." By 2004, he had developed his views on the topic, referring to reductions in manufacturing in the United States, outsourcing to India and China, excess of supply and the global marketplace, all leading to the increasing conceptualization of economic output.

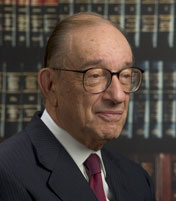
Alan Greenspan, chairman of the Board of Governors of the Federal Reserve, 1987-2006

In his book A Whole New Mind, Daniel H. Pink explains how the economy is now moving from the Information Age to the conceptual age. He describes how abundance (over-supply), Asia (outsourcing) and automation contribute to the need for business to concentrate on cognitive or creative assets such as design, storytelling, teamwork, empathy, play and meaning. He bases his approach on brain functions explaining how qualities dependent on the left hemisphere of the brain (logic, knowledge) now need to be complemented by those associated with right-brained processes (intuition and creative thinking).

Other contributors to our understanding of the conceptual economy include Tom Friedman who describes the opportunities of globalization in his book The World Is Flat. He emphasizes the importance of the internet and personal computers for communications and software sharing across the globe. This explains how American companies are able to outsource a substantial portion of their business to India and China with no disruptions for the customer.

Tom Kelley is also a key player in the field, both as general manager of IDEO, a successful design and innovation company, and as the author of two widely acclaimed books: The Art of Innovation, highlighting the importance of brainstorming and teamwork in product creation; and The Ten Faces of Innovation, explaining the role of assets such as empathy, storytelling, individual experiences and stimulating work environments in fostering creative ideas.

The key steps behind the conceptual economy fall into the following categories:

== The evolving state of the economy ==
According to some, the understanding of the economy was based on the premise that the way forward would depend on traditional values and qualifications such as those for accountants, lawyers, engineers, mathematicians or computer programmers. With the new opportunities resulting from globalization and the internet, the accepted forms of success are losing ground to scenarios drawing on innovative ideas. This may increase the need for artists, designers and creative authors to contribute not only to product design but also to business management and strategic planning.

Areas deserving particular attention are related to three key developments: over-supply, outsourcing and automation.

=== Over-supply ===
For the past 15 or 20 years, the Western economies (Europe, North America) have experienced a situation of fully dependable supply of basic goods, including round-the-year abundance of agricultural produce, with the result that a significant proportion of households have begun to look for more than just the basic necessities. Families now look for goods which extend beyond the basic norm such as organic foods or sophisticated digital television sets, mobile phones and cars with four-wheel drive, cruise control or integrated navigation systems.

=== Outsourcing ===
Given the low costs of labour in developing countries such as China, India and the Philippines, American and European companies are now outsourcing or offshoring an ever-increasing proportion of their production, manufacturing or service tasks to foreign countries. As a result, job opportunities in the West are slowly moving away from routine tasks such as accounting, telephone support services, computer programming and electronic component manufacturing. The efficiency of outsourcing has also been improving as the internet continues to provide increasingly reliable and ever faster global communications links.

=== Automation ===
In industry too, the development of robotics and automated manufacturing facilities means that opportunities for traditional jobs in industries such as automobile manufacturing and food processing are also diminishing. Ever higher levels of qualification are now required to contribute to operations that are largely computerized.

Mobile phones now offer a wide range of additional features

== New areas of opportunity ==
Partly a result of the above factors, a wide range of new facilities and opportunities has begun to emerge. These include:

- the development of appealing new internet-based facilities for sales and services,
- transportation logistics for better coordination of component supply and product distribution,
- customer-oriented interactive travel guides for more efficient and often cheaper travel abroad,
- value-added products combining a number of services, often into one small unit,
- computerized courseware to enhance on-the-job training, and
- sophisticated design tools for greater production efficiency.

Virtually every area of industry can benefit from developments of this kind both to improve the products themselves and to offer better marketing opportunities and after-sales services. As a result, these factors are seen as major contributors to increased productivity and economic growth.

== Criteria for economic success ==
In 2007, when the United States was seen as being on the verge of becoming a conceptual economy, prosperity was said to depend on "know[ing] what to do with knowledge, information and technology" and thus "judgment, intuition, creativity and insight".

=== Scholarship ===
Educational institutions need to place more emphasis on creativity and the arts rather than on traditional qualifications in the areas of engineering and management. In particular, more attention needs to be devoted to basic literacy, analytical and critical thinking, synthesis and quantitative skills.

=== Creativity and artistry ===
Until now, information technology has had considerable impact on the economy. Success depends on the application of existing knowledge and information. Here qualities such as intuition, creativity and game-based approaches are increasingly relevant to this process.

=== Cultural and technical diversity ===
In analyses of 21st-century economic competitiveness, frameworks frequently emphasize that institutional innovation relies on the integration of diverse cultural perspectives. Within globalization frameworks, models of the conceptual economy highlight collaborative interdisciplinary teamwork and creative strategy as primary drivers of market adaptability.

== See also ==
- Computer-aided manufacturing
- Creative industries
- Knowledge economy
- Cognitive-cultural economy
- New product development
- Globalization
- Cognitive robotics
- Information Age
- Imagination age

== Bibliography ==
- Friedman, Thomas L.: The World Is Flat: a Brief History of the Twenty-first Century, New York: Farrar, Straus and Giroux, 2005, 488 p., ISBN 0-374-29288-4
- Kelley, Tom, and Littman, Jonathan: The ten faces of innovation: IDEO’s strategies for beating the devil’s advocate & driving creativity throughout your organization, New York: Currency/Doubleday, c2005, 273 p., ISBN 0-385-51207-4
- Pink, Daniel H.: A Whole New Mind : moving from the information age to the conceptual age, New York: Riverhead Books, 2005, 260 p., ISBN 1-57322-308-5
- Rooney, David, Hearn, Greg, Ninan, Abraham: Handbook on the knowledge economy, Cheltenham: Edward Elgar, 2005, 290 p. ISBN 1-84376-795-3
