= Market development =

Growth strategy

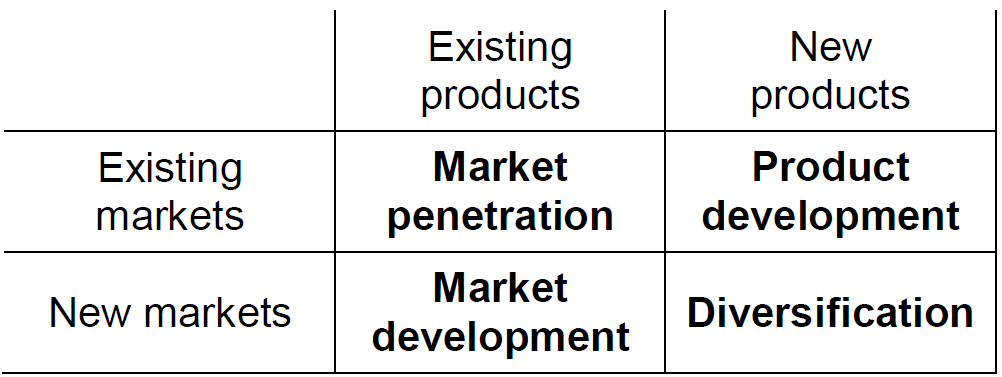
The Ansoff matrix compares market penetration, product development, market development and diversification.

Market development is a growth strategy that identifies and develops new market segments for current products. It involves marketing existing products in new markets. A development strategy targets non-buying customers in currently targeted segments. It also targets new customers in new segments. A market development strategy entails expanding the potential market through new users or new uses. New users can be defined as new geographic segments, new demographic segments, new institutional segments or new psychographic segments. Another way is to expand sales through new uses for the product.

For discontinuous innovations, which are those that impose a change of behavior, new learning, or a new process on the buyer or end user, a focused market development strategy is needed to bridge the gap between the early market and the mainstream.

A marketing manager is involved in many considerations before implementing a market development strategy, like whether the market is profitable, whether it will require the introduction of new or modified products and whether the customer and marketing channels are well enough researched and understood.

== See also ==
- Market penetration
- Product development
- Product diversification
