= NSCAD conceptual art =

Canadian artistic period

NSCAD conceptual art refers to a period beginning in 1969 when Nova Scotia College of Art and Design (NSCAD), a post-secondary art school in Halifax, Nova Scotia, Canada became an important art centre with an international reputation.

== History ==
In 1967, the artist Garry Kennedy was appointed President, and he immediately moved to remake the College from a provincial art school into an international centre for artistic activity. He invited notable artists to come to NSCAD as visiting artists, particularly those involved in conceptual art. Artists who made significant contributions during this period include Vito Acconci, Sol LeWitt, Dan Graham, Eric Fischl, Lawrence Weiner, Joseph Beuys and Claes Oldenburg.

== NSCAD University Press ==
Under the direction of Kennedy, The Press of the Nova Scotia College of Art and Design was established as a vehicle to publish books by and about leading contemporary artists. The Press was instrumental in establishing the university's international reputation. Between 1972 and 1987, 26 titles by such artists as Michael Snow, Steve Reich, Gerhard Richter and Yvonne Rainer were published. From 1977-1987, Benjamin Buchloh served as editor of the Press.

== See also ==
- Conceptual art
- Canadian art
