= Conceptual change =

Conceptual change is the process whereby concepts and relationships between them change over the course of an individual person's lifetime or over the course of history. Research in four different fields – cognitive psychology, cognitive developmental psychology, science education, and history and philosophy of science - has sought to understand this process. Indeed, the convergence of these four fields, in their effort to understand how concepts change in content and organization, has led to the emergence of an interdisciplinary sub-field in its own right. This sub-field is referred to as "conceptual change" research.

== Origins ==
Cognitive psychologists studied the process of conceptual change and its two counterpoints:

1. Closed-mindedness: The reluctance to consider ideas which conflict with one's own established beliefs.
2. Belief perseverance: The tendency to cling to such ideas even after they have suffered decisive refutations. For instance, in the 1950s, Festinger, Riecken, and Schachter joined a cult whose members shared the belief that the world would end on December 21, 1954. After the prediction failed, most believers still clung to their earlier conceptual framework. Subsequent investigations confirmed and amplified the results of these initial experiments.

Within cognitive developmental psychology, the interest in conceptual change was motivated by problems identified in the stage theory of cognitive development proposed by Jean Piaget. Piaget claimed that the developing child passed through a series of four distinct stages of thought and that concept development reflected these broad transitions between stages. However, it increasingly became apparent that children's conceptual development was best described in terms of distinct developmental trajectories for each conceptual domain considered (e.g. knowledge about number, knowledge about the motion and interaction of inanimate objects, and knowledge about goal-directed intentional entities). The term "conceptual change" was increasingly used as work on these distinct developmental trajectories led to the discovery that a variety of types of changes occur in the content and organization of concepts.

In parallel, researchers in science education were learning that one of the main reasons students often found scientific concepts like force and energy difficult to understand was the intuitive concepts about the natural world that students brought with them to the classroom. It became clear that students were assimilating the scientific ideas presented to them in the classroom into their existing concepts, resulting in what came to be referred to as "misconceptions". Researchers in science education turned to the task of identifying these pre-instruction ideas and sought instructional strategies that would succeed in helping student transform their intuitive concepts into more scientific alternatives.

These developments in cognitive studies of resistance to conceptual change, cognitive developmental psychology and science education occurred against a background of (and were influenced by) developments within the history and philosophy of science. Arguably, most important was the novel approach to how scientific concepts and theories change over the course of history put forward by Thomas Kuhn in 1962 in his landmark book, The Structure of Scientific Revolutions. In this book, Kuhn argued that changes in the scientific understanding of the natural world should not be seen as a gradual, incremental progress toward ever better understanding. He pointed out that it is sometimes very difficult to characterize how a more recent concept is better than a predecessor. The reason for the difficulty is that the successive concepts are embedded in a distinct set of relationships with other concepts and investigative techniques. Thus, the content of the two concepts and relationships to others can be so different that it is inappropriate to compare the two successor concepts directly with one another. An important concept to emerge from this reasoning was the idea of a "paradigm." Commentators have noted that Kuhn used the term in a number of different senses. However, one sense seems to have had the most influence on what came to be referred to as "conceptual change research." That is, the idea of a "paradigm" understood as an integrative set of theoretical concepts and methods taken for granted by a particular research community. According to Kuhn, most of scientists' work is conducted within a paradigm (what Kuhn called "normal science"). Occasionally, however, insurmountable problems lead scientists to question the paradigm's assumptions, and a new paradigm emerges (what Kuhn called "a paradigm shift").

Kuhn's work, and that of other philosophers and historians of science, had a substantial influence on cognitive developmental and science education research. Increasingly, human beings' concepts were seen as embedded within their own set of relationships with other concepts and the process of conceptual change came to be seen as a kind of paradigm shift.

== Emerging theoretical perspectives and recent developments ==
The claims about concept and theory change made by philosophers and historians of science served as a source of hypotheses about conceptual change occurring or failing to occur in everyday life, during child development, and in the classroom. These initial hypotheses served as the driving force for much theoretical and empirical research. A number of perspectives on conceptual change have emerged, and proponents have been engaging in a lively debate since the early 1980s.

One perspective views the process of conceptual change as "theory change". The concepts of the adult or child or learner are seen as themselves embedded within intuitive theories that require substantial restructuring if they are to resemble those of the scientist. This perspective was the most directly inspired by Kuhn's work. Indeed, some specific adult beliefs and children's pre-instruction concepts were seen as resembling some early concepts in the history of science.

A closely related perspective to this theory change view makes a particular claim about the differences between naïve and scientific concepts. This "ontological shift" view emphasizes that many naïve concepts are incorrectly assigned to the broad (ontological) category of material substance rather than to the ontological category of (constraint-based) processes. Conceptual change, on this view, involves constructing the new ontological category of constraint-based processes and reassigning the concept to this correct category.

A third view, draws from some of the basic commitments of these first two views but provides a more dynamic account of the formation of naïve conceptions. This "framework theory" view suggests that when new ideas are encountered, basic ontological commitments influence how they are ignored, resisted, or assimilated. The result is often a model consistent with both the ontological commitments and aspects of the new ideas presented. However, there is often a distortion of the new idea in the process. Successful conceptual change on this view requires strategic changes in the interfering ontological commitments.

Finally, a fourth view adopts a more systemic approach to concepts and how they change. This "knowledge-in-pieces" or "resources" perspective views both naïve and scientific conceptual understanding as grounded in multiple, small knowledge resources that can be considered "sub-conceptual." These are sub-conceptual in that they are of a smaller "grain size" than meanings associated with words and often can be seen to originate from abstractions from sensorimotor schemas. Since both naïve and scientific conceptions are grounded in the same broad pool of sub-conceptual resources, conceptual change is seen as the reorganization of these resources. The reorganization is seen as involving the gradual increase in the degree of coherence and consistency in the application of knowledge systems composed of a heterogeneous collection of resources.

Most conceptual change researchers can be seen as adhering to one or the other of the above four perspectives. In addition, theoretical accounts of conceptual change have varied on another dimension – the extent to which the process of change should be seen as a "rational" or purely "cognitive" process, as opposed to one involving emotional, motivational and sociocultural elements. Recently, there has been greater interest in clarifying this distinction and increasingly greater attempts to create links across this divide. Despite the various points of disagreement, there has been a great deal of consensus around the idea that successful conceptual change often requires meta-conceptual awareness and sophistication on the part of the learner. However, some of the intuitive conceptions people hold cannot be changed because they are pervasive, persistent, and helpful in some contexts such as everyday life. Here, researchers have attempted not to change students’ conceptions but to help students become metacognitively aware of these intuitive conceptions and inhibit these conceptions in scientific contexts. Instructional approaches based on metacognition and self-regulated learning have been found to be effective in this regard and in enhancing students’ conceptual understanding.

== How does conceptual change happen and how can it be supported? ==
The way in which conceptual change research has addressed these two related questions highlights the synergy that has emerged between cognitive developmental psychology, cognitive psychology, science education and the history and philosophy of science.

The attempt to understand the psychological processes that lead to conceptual change in the individual has predominantly been the purview of cognitive developmental psychology. In addition, research in cognitive psychology has underscored deep-seated resistance to conceptual change, and explored tactics of overcoming such resistance. Many of the psychological insights have been also motivated by proposals in the history and philosophy of science since Kuhn. Kuhn's work emphasized the resistance to conceptual change and the role of anomalous data as a drive for change. Moreover, what has come to be called cognitive-historical analysis, developed by Nancy J. Nersessian, has been very influential. This type of analysis involves conducting historical case-studies of important episodes of theoretical change in the history of science and making use of the analytical tools of cognitive science to provide accounts of the cognitive processes involved. Such analyses have documented the importance of such process as analogical reasoning, the use of visual representations, and thought experiment, collectively referred to as model-based reasoning processes. Thus, the drive to make sense of anomalous observations that are inconsistent with existing concepts and the various model-based reasoning processes have been proposed as sources of conceptual change in individuals and learners. Recent cognitive developmental work has also added language to this list.

Most researchers accept the above list of sources of conceptual change (with the exception of language, which is the most recent addition to this list and perhaps the most controversial). They differ, however, in their accounts of relative importance of the different sources and the details of their role in the process of change.

The identification of sources of conceptual change has inspired the design of pedagogical interventions that aim to promote the development of deep conceptual understanding of challenging concepts. Science education research has been able to provide some documentation about the effectiveness of these interventions. However, more experimental studies are needed that incorporate careful controls. When carefully controlled experiments are conducted, specific interventions that are effective in dealing with students' alternative conceptions can be identified, such as it has been shown for a self-assessment of one’s conceptions or metaconceptual knowledge about alternative conceptions. Moreover, while some extended classroom based studies exist, more research documenting the applicability and generalizability of conceptual change based instruction is needed. Furthermore, it should be investigated to what extent science teachers promote conceptual change in their students and how their ability to support conceptual change can be improved through professional development programs. Often teachers do not address students’ conceptions and thus do not support conceptual change.

== The scope of conceptual change research ==
While much of conceptual research has been geared to scientific concepts, recent work is increasingly emerging in other domains. Conceptual change is now being examined in the laboratory, ordinary life, mathematics and history. More research in more domains is needed. This will provide a basis for insights about similarities and differences in how conceptual change occurs in different domains.

== See also ==
- Belief perseverance
- Educational psychology
- Learning theory
- Pedagogical constructivism

== Other references ==
- Vosniadou, Stella (2008). International handbook of research on conceptual change. New York: Routledge. ISBN 978-0-8058-6044-3.
