= Igor Ansoff =

American economist

- Игорь Ансов
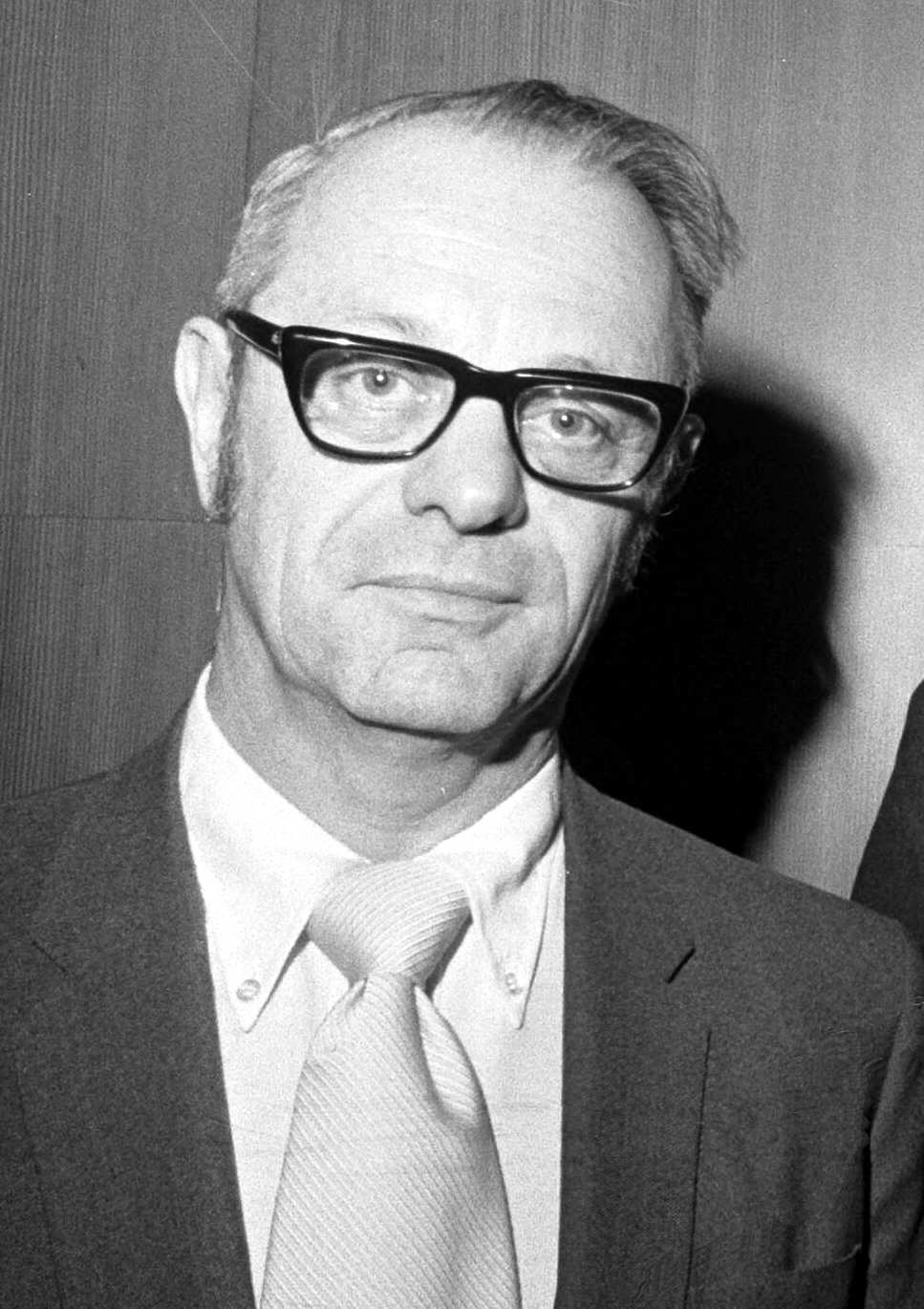
- Born: December 12, 1918; Vladivostok, Russia
- Died: July 14, 2002 (aged 83); San Diego, California, USA
- Known for: Ansoff Matrix

Academic background
- Education: Stevens Institute of Technology (B.E., M.E.); Brown University (Ph.D.)

Academic work
- Institutions: Carnegie Mellon University; Vanderbilt University

Igor Ansoff (Russian: Игорь Ансов; 12 December 1918 – 14 July 2002) was a Russian-American applied mathematician and business manager. He is known as the father of strategic management.

== Biography ==
=== Early life ===
Igor Ansoff (ne Shugarman) was born in Vladivostok, Russia, on December 12, 1918. His father Schmuel Wolchover was born in 1884 to a family of Jewish immigrants from the Russian Empire Karl and Roza Wolchover, who settled in Evansville, Indiana. He moved to Moscow to work in the U.S. Embassy and changes his name to Boris-Sam Shugarman; he had two daughters in his first marriage to Faina Shugarman (nee Levi), Mary (1908) and Victoria (1910). After the divorce, he married Eva Shugarman (nee Vagin), their only son Harry Igor was born in 1918 in Vladivostok.

At the time of Igor's birth, his father Boris-Sam Shugarman, was secretary to the American Consul General in Moscow, David R. Francis, and had just completed a cross-Siberian trip on behalf of the American Red Cross, examining living conditions in prisoner of war camps. This concluded with a trip to Japan in 1918, after which the family moved to Vladivostok. The United States had a large military and industrial presence in the Far East of Russia, with more than 3,000 troops on the ground under the command of General William S. Graves. During the six years that it took for the Bolshevik Revolution to make its way to Vladivostok, US embassies were slowly being shut down and their contents moved east. Many strategic records ended up in Tokyo and were destroyed in an earthquake and fire. Most of the remaining embassy documents made their way to Vladivostok.

The Shugarmans lived in Vladivostok until the US Embassy closed in 1924, until they returned to Moscow, with Boris-Sam Shugarman now a Soviet citizen. They travelled the 9,000 km (5592.3 mi) on the Trans-Siberian Railway, crossing Siberia in the middle of winter in a place where temperatures of -35 Celsius (-31 Fahrenheit) are common. The cattle cars of the trans-siberian were heated by coal burning stoves and the occupants slept on straw laid out on timber bunks.

With his father's American origin and his mother's "capitalist" background (her father had owned a small samovar factory in the town of Tula some hundred miles south of Moscow), the Shugarmans were suspected members of the bourgeoisie, a group assumed to harbor "counterrevolutionary" hopes and tendencies.

Igor's life in Moscow engendered in him a distrust of any system (political or organizational) that claimed to be too perfect or too tidy. This spirit "expressed itself through my inability to join other 'systems' in which I lived, studied, and worked. It reinforced my drive to excel in order to force the system to recognize and reward me. And perversely, it also drove me to excel through making innovative contributions which challenged the systems cultures."

From 1932 to 1933, two major events occurred in Soviet society: first, a massive and destructive famine, followed by the commencement of the Great Purge. In 1933 there was also a thawing of relations between the US and the Soviet Union, which led to the re-opening of the US embassy in Moscow under Ambassador William Bullit.

With the reestablishment of the American Embassy in Moscow, his father (now Samuel Shugarman) was able to get a clerical job and apply for restoration of his American citizenship.

The Shugarmans left Russia through Leningrad in September 1936 on a small freighter, which accommodated a dozen passengers. The ship took two weeks to cross the Atlantic Ocean, finally docking in New York.

Igor, who was then 17 years old, was admitted to the Stuyvesant High School in lower Manhattan, which was one of two premier high schools in New York City. Igor's grades were translated into American equivalents which made it possible for him to graduate after only one year.

In 1937, Igor graduated with the highest honors at the end of the year, which guaranteed him a four-year scholarship with all expenses paid in the New York State University system. He was also offered a scholarship at the Stevens Institute of Technology in Hoboken, New Jersey, one of the best and most expensive engineering schools in the country. The scholarship was for one year and its continuation was contingent on performing in the upper 10% of his class. Contrary to his parents' advice, who were still financially struggling, he went to Stevens.

Five years after arriving in New York, Igor graduated at the top of his class from Stevens Institute of Technology. He had also reached the conclusion that he did not want to practice engineering.

=== Career ===
Seeking a broader perspective, he received a Master's degree in Modern Physics. World War II intervened, and in 1946 he went to Brown University to get a Doctoral degree in Applied Mathematics. His formal education was completed in 1948 when he was 30 years old. He was married the day after defending his dissertation to his wife Dorothy, also known as Skip, and then traveled to Santa Monica, California, where he joined UCLA in the Senior Executive Program.

During World War II, he was a member of the U.S. Naval Reserve, and served as a Liaison with the Russian Navy and as an instructor in physics at the U.S. Naval Academy.

In California, he was offered a job in the Mathematics Department of the RAND Corporation. Moving laterally within RAND, Igor become a Project Manager in the large-scale project activity focused on making recommendations to the U.S. Air Force on technology and weapon systems acquisition. His second major study at RAND addressed the vulnerability of NATO Air Forces. The inclusion of "soft metrics" was treated with disdain by RAND and the airforce, and Igor learned his first lesson in organizational myopia, which was to become one of his primary concerns some 20 years later.

In 1957 Igor left RAND to join the Corporate Planning Department of the Lockheed Aircraft Corporation. At Lockheed he became Vice President of Planning and Director of Diversification. His experience at Lockheed focused his attention and trained him to deal with the problem of managing organizations in the face of environmental discontinuities which became the central focus of his attention during the following 30 years.

One morning while shaving Igor realized that he had no idea of what he wanted to do with the rest of his life. While on vacation at Cape Cod he developed a long-term plan to take early retirement from Lockheed and find a job in a school of management. Within a year he was approached by The Graduate School of Industrial Administration at the Carnegie Mellon University about joining the GSIA faculty. When he entered GSIA he was allowed a year free from teaching to enable him to finish his book, Corporate Strategy, which was published in 1965 and was an immediate success. He served as Professor of Industrial Administration in the Graduate School at Carnegie Mellon University from 1963 until 1968.

In 1969 he accepted a position as Founding Dean of the new Owen Graduate School of Management at Vanderbilt University in Nashville, Tennessee. He accepted the position under the condition that the school would specialize in educating change agents, a type of manager which was badly needed in industry and not produced by any U.S. school of business at that time. He worked as a professor of Management there until 1973.

In 1983 he joined the U.S. International University (USIU, now Alliant International University) where he created the school's strategic management program.

Professionally, he is known worldwide for his research in three specific areas:

- The concept of environmental turbulence;
- The contingent strategic success paradigm, a concept that has been validated by numerous doctoral dissertations;
- Real-time strategic management.

Marketing and MBA students are usually familiar with his Ansoff Matrix, a tool he created to plot generic strategies for growing a business, via existing or new products, in existing or new markets.

He has consulted with hundreds of multinational corporations including, Philips, General Electric, Gulf, IBM, Sterling Airlines and Westinghouse.

To honor his body of work, the prestigious Igor Ansoff Award was established in 1981 in the Netherlands. The award is given for research and management in the study of Strategic Planning and Management. The Japan Strategic Management Society has also established an annual award in his name and Vanderbilt University has established an Ansoff MBA scholarship. He was awarded five honorary doctorate degrees over the years, including the University of Bath.

Igor retired from USIU two years before his death as a distinguished professor emeritus.

=== Death ===
He died of complications from pneumonia in San Diego, California, on July 14, 2002. Survivors of his death included his wife; three sons, Rick, Chris, and Peter; and two grandchildren.

== Works ==
- The New Corporate Strategy (1988)
- Implanting Strategic Management (1984, second edition 1990)
- Strategic Management (1979)
- Acquisition Behavior of U.S. Manufacturing Firms, 1946-1965 (1971)
- Business Strategy: Selected Readings (1969)
- Corporate Strategy: An Analytic Approach to Business Policy for Growth and Expansion (1965)
