= Tesco =

British multinational retail groceries company

Coordinates: 51°48′36″N 0°11′47″W

Tesco plc
- Logo used since 2026
- Formerly: Tesco Stores (Holdings) Limited (1947–1981); Tesco Stores (Holdings) Public Limited Company (1981–1983)
- Type: Public
- Traded as: LSE: TSCO; FTSE 100 component
- ISIN: GB00BLGZ9862
- Industry: Retail
- Founded: 1919; 107 years ago Hackney, London, England, UK
- Founder: Sir Jack Cohen
- Headquarters: Tesco House, Shire Park, Kestrel Way, Welwyn Garden City, Hertfordshire, England, UK
- Number of locations: 5,040 (2026)
- Area served: Czech Republic; Hungary; Ireland; Slovakia; United Kingdom
- Key people: Gerry Murphy (chairman); Ken Murphy (CEO)
- Products: Supermarket; Hypermarket; Superstore; Convenience shop
- Brands: One Stop; F&F; Paperchase
- Revenue: ▲£72.886 billion (2026)
- Operating income: ▲£3.194 billion (2026)
- Net income: ▲£1.787 billion (2026)
- Total assets: ▲£39.474 billion (2026)
- Total equity: ▼£11.457 billion (2026)
- Number of employees: 330,000 (2026)
- Divisions: Tesco Stores Limited; Tesco Bank (Note: Owned by Barclays); Tesco Mobile (50%); Tesco Ireland; Booker Group; Dunnhumby
- Website: tesco.com tescoplc.com

Tesco PLC (/ˈtɛs.koʊ/) is a British multinational groceries and general merchandise retailer headquartered in the United Kingdom at its head offices in Welwyn Garden City, England. The company was founded by Sir Jack Cohen in Hackney, London, in 1919. In 2023, it was the 15th largest retailer in the world by revenue. It is the market leader of groceries in the UK (where it has a market share of around 28.4%). Tesco also has stores in the Czech Republic, Ireland, Slovakia, the Isle of Man and Hungary.

Since the 1960s, Tesco has diversified into areas such as the retailing of books, clothing, electronics, furniture, toys, petrol, software, financial services, telecommunications and internet services. In the 1990s, Tesco re-positioned itself from being a downmarket high-volume low-cost retailer, attempting to attract a range of social groups with its low-cost "Tesco Value" range (launched 1993) and premium "Tesco Finest" range.

Tesco is listed on the London Stock Exchange and is a constituent of the FTSE 100 Index.

== History ==
=== Origins ===
Jack Cohen, the son of Jewish migrants from Poland, founded Tesco in 1919 when he began to sell war-surplus groceries from a stall at Well Street Market, Hackney, in the East End of London. The Tesco brand first appeared in 1924. The name came about after Jack Cohen bought a shipment of tea from Thomas Edward Stockwell. He made new labels using the initials of the supplier's name (TES), and the first two letters of his surname (CO), forming the word TESCO.

After experimenting with his first permanent indoor market stall at Tooting in November 1930, Jack Cohen opened the first Tesco shop in September 1931 at 54 Watling Avenue, Burnt Oak, Edgware, Middlesex. Tesco was floated on the London Stock Exchange in 1947 as Tesco Stores (Holdings) Limited. The first self-service shop opened in St Albans in 1948 (which remained operational until 2010 before relocating to larger premises on the same street, with a period as a Tesco Metro), and the first supermarket in Maldon in 1956.

=== Expansion ===
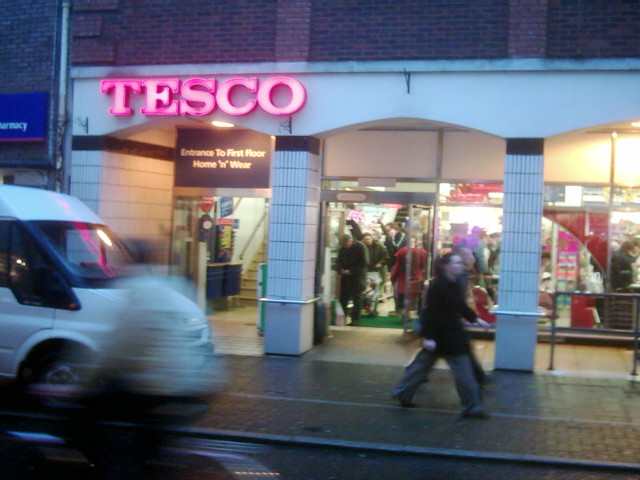
Tesco in Tiverton, Devon, England, c. 2004

During the 1950s and 1960s, Tesco grew organically, and also through acquisitions, until it owned more than 800 shops. The company purchased 70 Williamson's shops (1957), 200 Harrow Stores outlets (1959), 212 Irwins shops (1960), 97 Charles Phillips shops (1964) and the Victor Value chain (1968) (sold to Bejam in 1986).

Jack Cohen's business motto was "pile it high and sell it cheap", to which he added an internal motto of "YCDBSOYA" (You Can't Do Business Sitting On Your Arse) which he used to motivate his sales force.

In May 1987, Tesco completed its hostile takeover of the Hillards chain of 40 supermarkets in the North of England for £220 million.

In 1994, the company took over the supermarket chain William Low after fighting off Sainsbury's for control of the Dundee-based firm, which operated 57 shops. This paved the way for Tesco to expand its presence in Scotland, in which its presence was weaker than in England.

Tesco introduced a loyalty card, branded 'Clubcard' in 1995, and later an Internet shopping service. In 1996, the typeface of the logo was changed to the current version with stripe reflections underneath, whilst the corporate font used for shop signage was changed from the familiar "typewriter" font that had been used since the 1970s. Overseas operations were introduced in the same year. Terry Leahy assumed the role of Chief Executive in February 1997.

In March 1997, Tesco purchased the retail arm of Associated British Foods, which consisted of the Quinnsworth, Stewarts and Crazy Prices chains in Ireland and Northern Ireland, and associated businesses, for £640 million. The deal was approved by the European Commission in May 1997.

The company was the subject of a letter bomb campaign lasting five months from August 2000 to February 2001, as a bomber calling himself "Sally" sent letter bombs to Tesco customers and demanded that Clubcards be modified to be capable of withdrawing money from cash machines.

=== Diversification ===
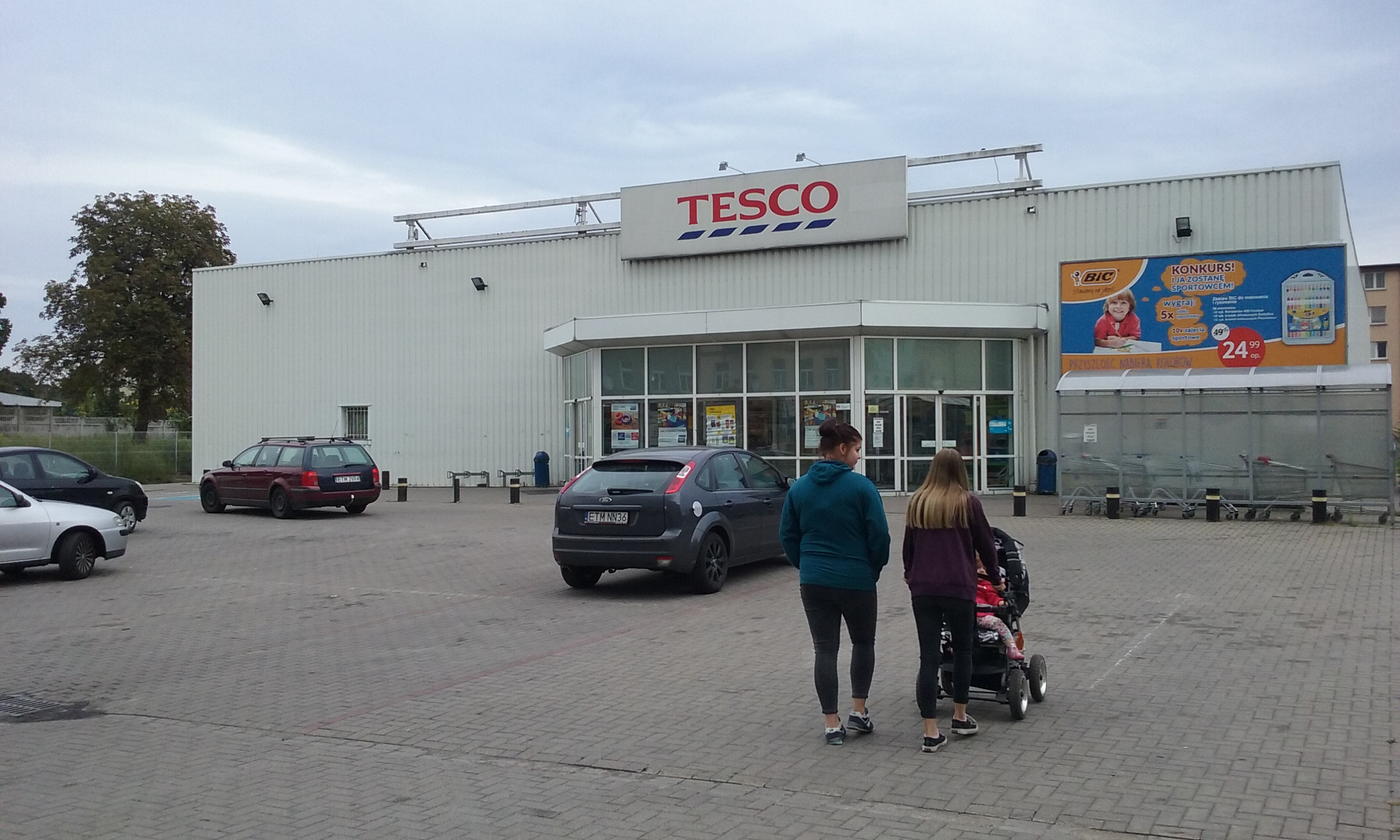
Tesco in Tomaszów Mazowiecki, Poland, 2018

In the 1960s, Tesco expanded the range of products it sold to include household goods and clothing under the Delamare brand, and in 1974 opened its first petrol station.

In 2001, Tesco became involved in internet grocery retailing in the US when it obtained a 35% stake in GroceryWorks.

In 2002, Tesco purchased 13 HIT hypermarkets in Poland. It made a major move into the UK's convenience shop market with its purchase of T&S Stores, owner of 870 convenience shops in the One Stop, Dillons, and Day & Nite chains in the UK.

In June 2003, Tesco purchased the C Two-Network in Japan. It acquired a majority stake in the Turkish supermarket chain Kipa. In January 2004, Tesco acquired Adminstore, owner of 45 Cullens, Europa, and Harts convenience shops, in and around London.

In Thailand, Tesco Lotus was a joint venture of the Charoen Pokphand Group and Tesco but, facing criticism over the growth of hypermarkets, CP Group sold its Tesco Lotus shares in 2003.

In late 2005 Tesco acquired the 21 remaining Safeway/BP shops after Morrisons dissolved the Safeway/BP partnership.

In 2006, Tesco announced plans to move into the United States by opening a chain of small-format groceries in the Western states (Arizona, California, and Nevada) in 2007 named Fresh & Easy. Tesco pulled out of the United States market in 2013, following performance issues.

=== 2010s ===
In 2010, Tesco started funding a small film studio intended to produce Tesco-exclusive direct-to-DVD films. The first film was released on 6 September called Paris Connections, based on a popular novel by Jackie Collins.

In 2013, Tesco pulled out of its US market (Fresh & Easy) stores in April, after it filed for Chapter 11 bankruptcy, at a reported cost of £1.2 billion. In September, Tesco announced that it would sell the business to Ronald Burkle's Yucaipa Companies for an undisclosed amount. Tesco also purchased the restaurant and cafe chain Giraffe for £48.6 million.

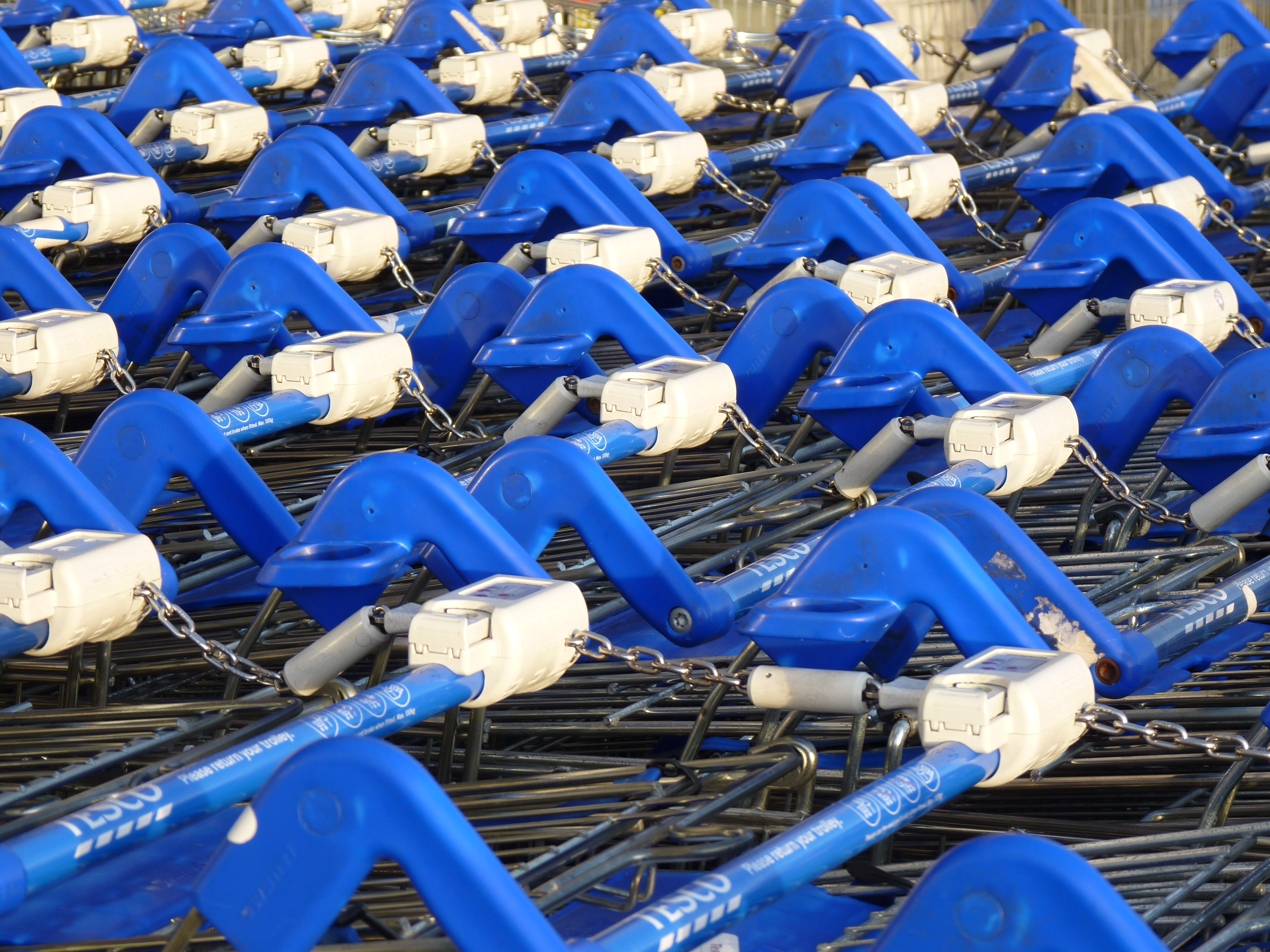
Tesco trollies

In 2015, Tesco sold its Blinkbox on-demand video service and its fixed-line telephone and broadband business to TalkTalk. In January, Tesco sold the Blinkbox Music streaming service to now-defunct Guvera, and confirmed it would close its Blinkbox Books service by the end of February.

In 2016, Tesco confirmed it was seeking to sell Dobbies Garden Centres, Giraffe Restaurants, and Harris + Hoole to concentrate on its main supermarket business.

In 2017, Tesco reached an agreement to merge with Britain's biggest wholesaler Booker Group. There were concerns over market dominance with Tesco being Britain's largest food retailer and Booker being the UK's largest wholesaler. In April, the company sold its in-shop opticians' business to Vision Express. In June, Tesco announced a major cost-cutting initiative that would reduce the company's workforce by over 1,200 workers. Key reductions included over a quarter of its employees in Welwyn Garden City and Hatfield, and the closure of the call centre in Cardiff. The company hoped to reduce costs by £1.5 billion.

In 2019, Tesco announced another cost-cutting initiative that would close the food counters in 90 stores, affecting around 9,000 workers. In October 2019, Tesco announced that CEO Dave Lewis would step down in 2020, and would be succeeded by Ken Murphy.

=== 2020s ===
In February 2020, Tesco announced the sale of its 20% stake in its Chinese joint venture with China Resources for £257 million. The joint venture, created in 2014, had taken over all of Tesco’s stores in China. In March 2020, Tesco announced the sale of its operations in Thailand and Malaysia, comprising 2,000 stores (including Tesco Lotus supermarkets), to Charoen Pokphand Group for $10 billion. In June 2020, Tesco announced the sale of its operations in Poland, comprising nearly 300 stores, to Salling Group for £165 million.

Countries served by Tesco stores: Currently operating Previously operated

In 2023, Tesco acquired all nine Shoprite shops on the Isle of Man from the Nicholson family who had built the chain up since 1972.

In February 2024, Barclays announced the acquisition of most of Tesco's banking operations for £600 million, along with the signing of a 10-year partnership between the two companies.

In October 2026, Tesco announced it was selling its Czech and Slovak operations to Ahold Delhaize for approximately €1.7 billion. Pending regulatory approval, the deal is set to close in late 2027. Tesco's operations in Ireland and Hungary are not part of the sale.

It supports LGBTQ+ charities and organizations, and has made substantial donations to them. It regularly appears in Pride marches.

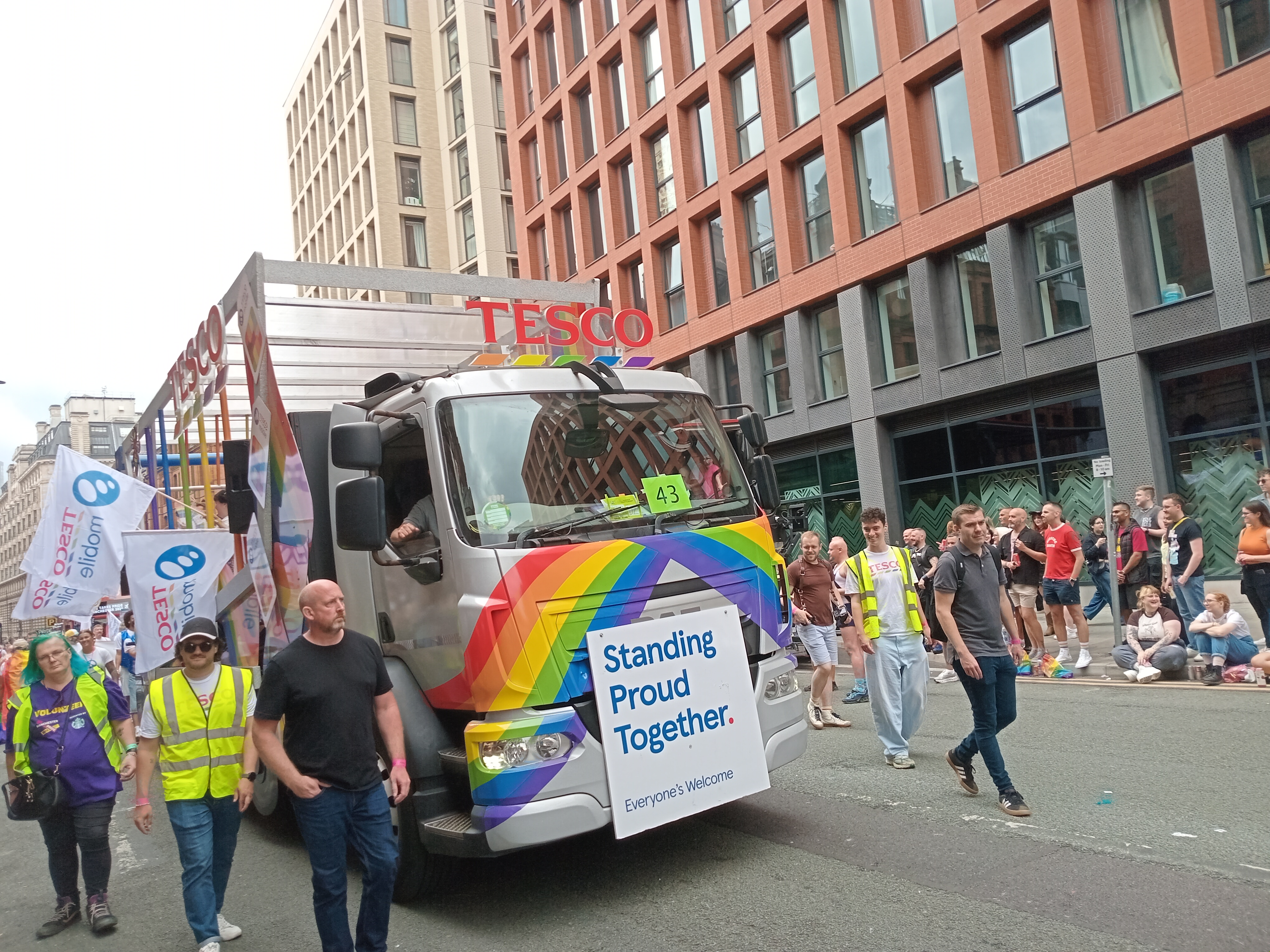
Manchester Pride 2025 Tesco

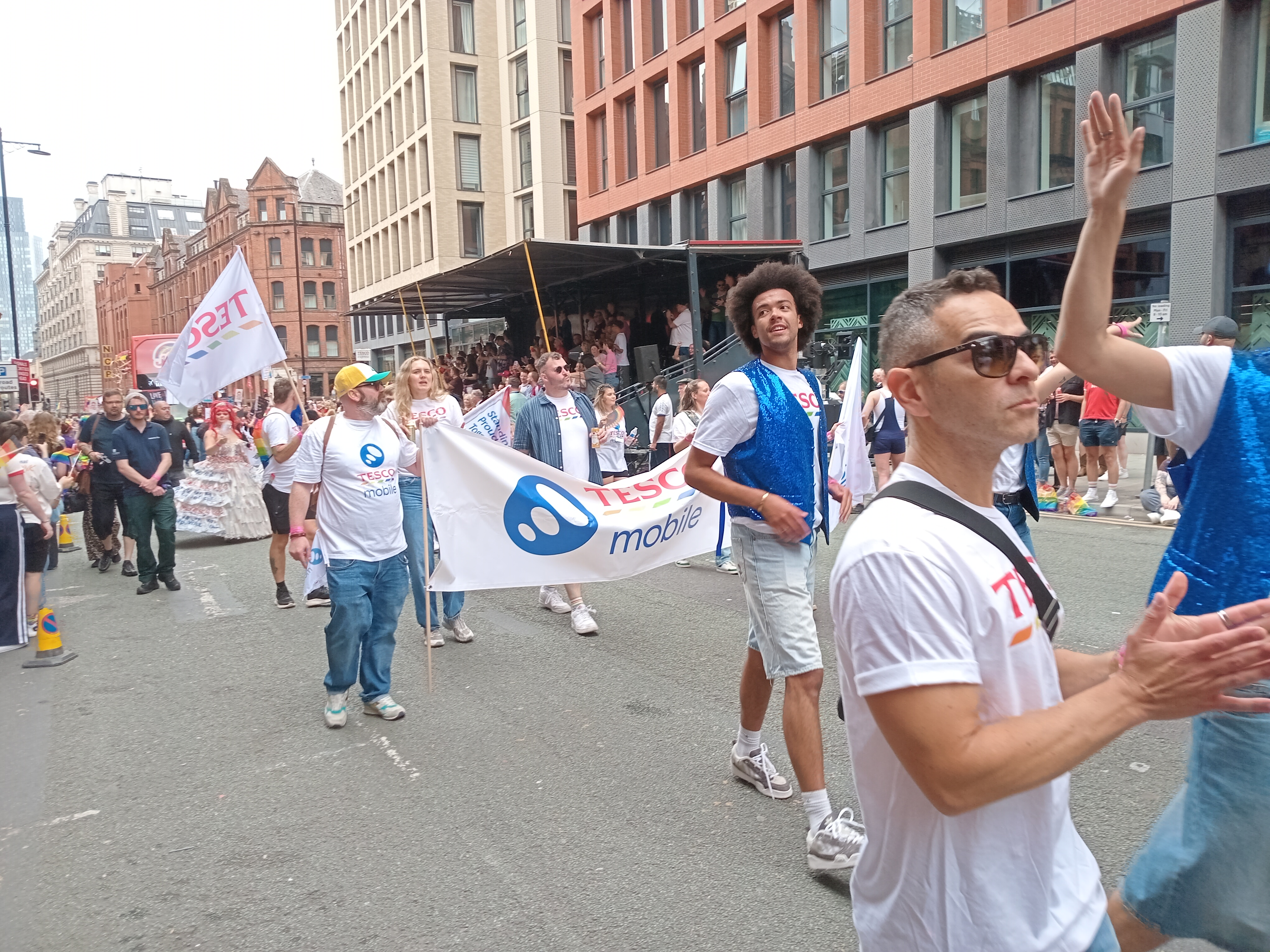
Manchester Pride 2025 Tesco marchers

== UK operations ==
As of February 2026, Tesco's UK shop portfolio was as follows:

Format	Number	Total area (sq ft)	Percentage of space
Large Store (Extra and Superstore)	813	31,163,000	66.3%
Convenience (Express)	2,148	5,747,000	12.2%
Dotcom only	6	716,000	1.5%
One Stop	714	1,180,000	2.5%
One Stop (franchised)	386	564,000	1.2%
Booker	189	7,642,000	16.3%
Total	4,256	47,012,000	100.00%

=== Tesco ===
==== Hypermarkets ====
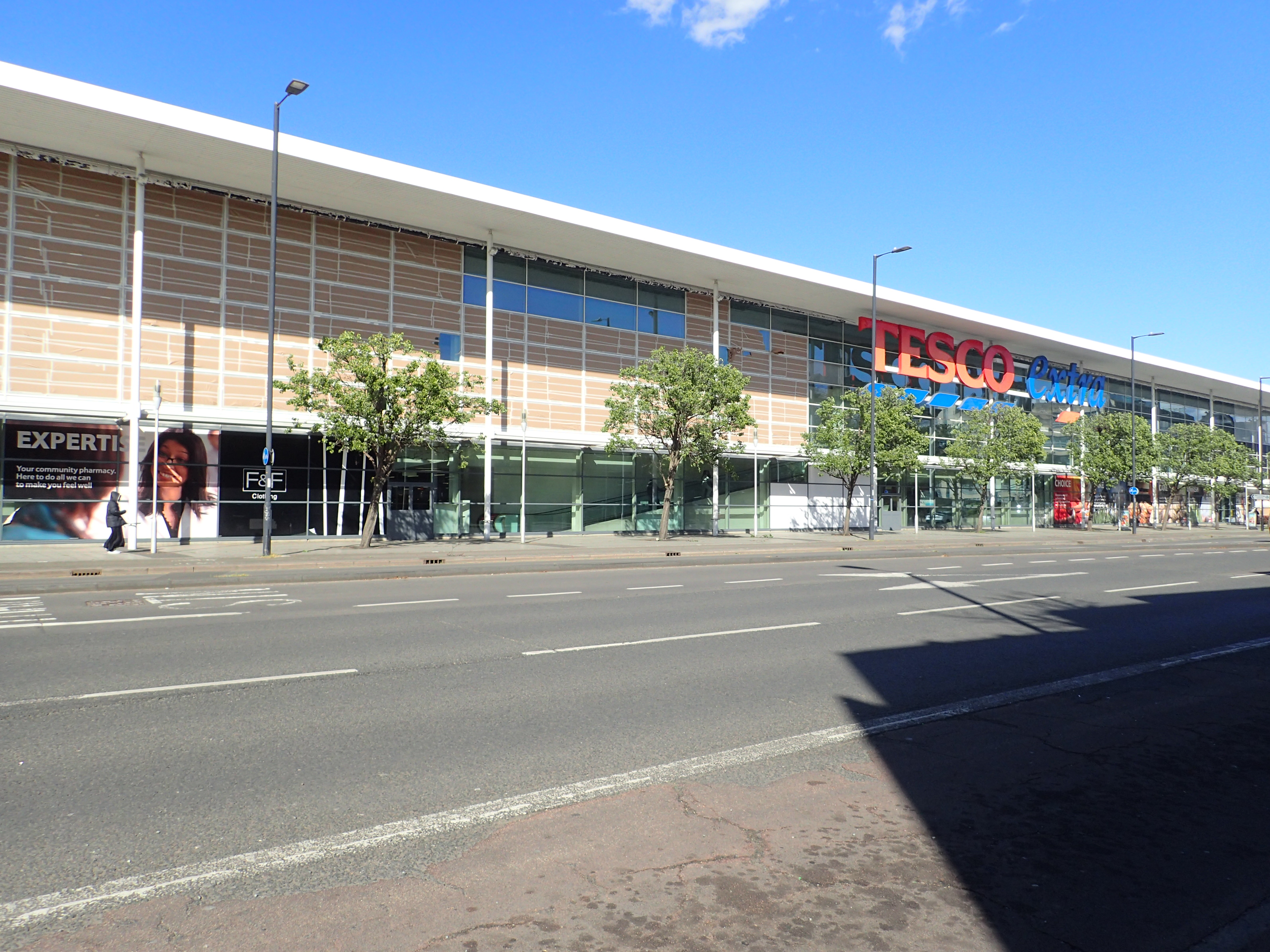
Tesco Extra store in Slough, Berkshire, 2025

Tesco Extra shops are larger, mainly out-of-town hypermarkets that stock nearly all of Tesco's product ranges, although some are in the heart of town centres and inner-city locations. The largest shop in England by floor space is Tesco Extra in Walkden, with 17,230 square metres (185,500 sq ft) of floor space.

In common with other towns, such as Warrington, the St Helens shop, which at 13,000 m^{2} (140,000 sq ft) is one of the biggest in England, was developed on the same site as the town's new rugby league stadium.

==== Supermarkets ====
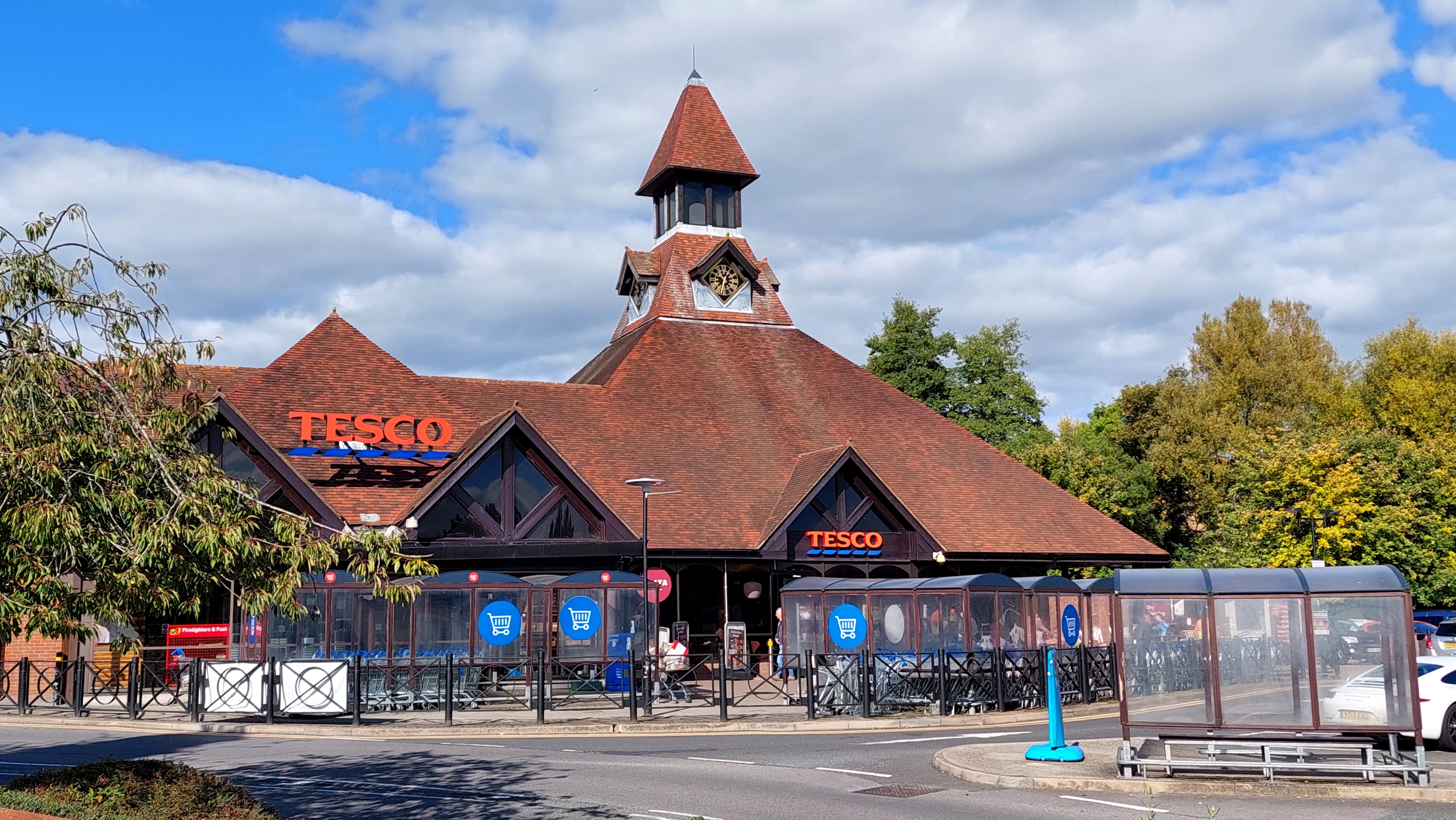
Tesco supermarket in Amersham, Buckinghamshire, 2022

Tesco Superstores are standard large supermarkets, stocking groceries and a much smaller range of non-food goods than Extra hypermarkets. The shops have always been branded as 'Tesco', but a new shop in Liverpool was the first to use the format brand 'Tesco Superstore' above the door.

Tesco operates a number of in-shop cafes. Tesco began to introduce new restaurants in its shops from 2013 under the "Decks Carvery" brand.

==== Tesco Express ====
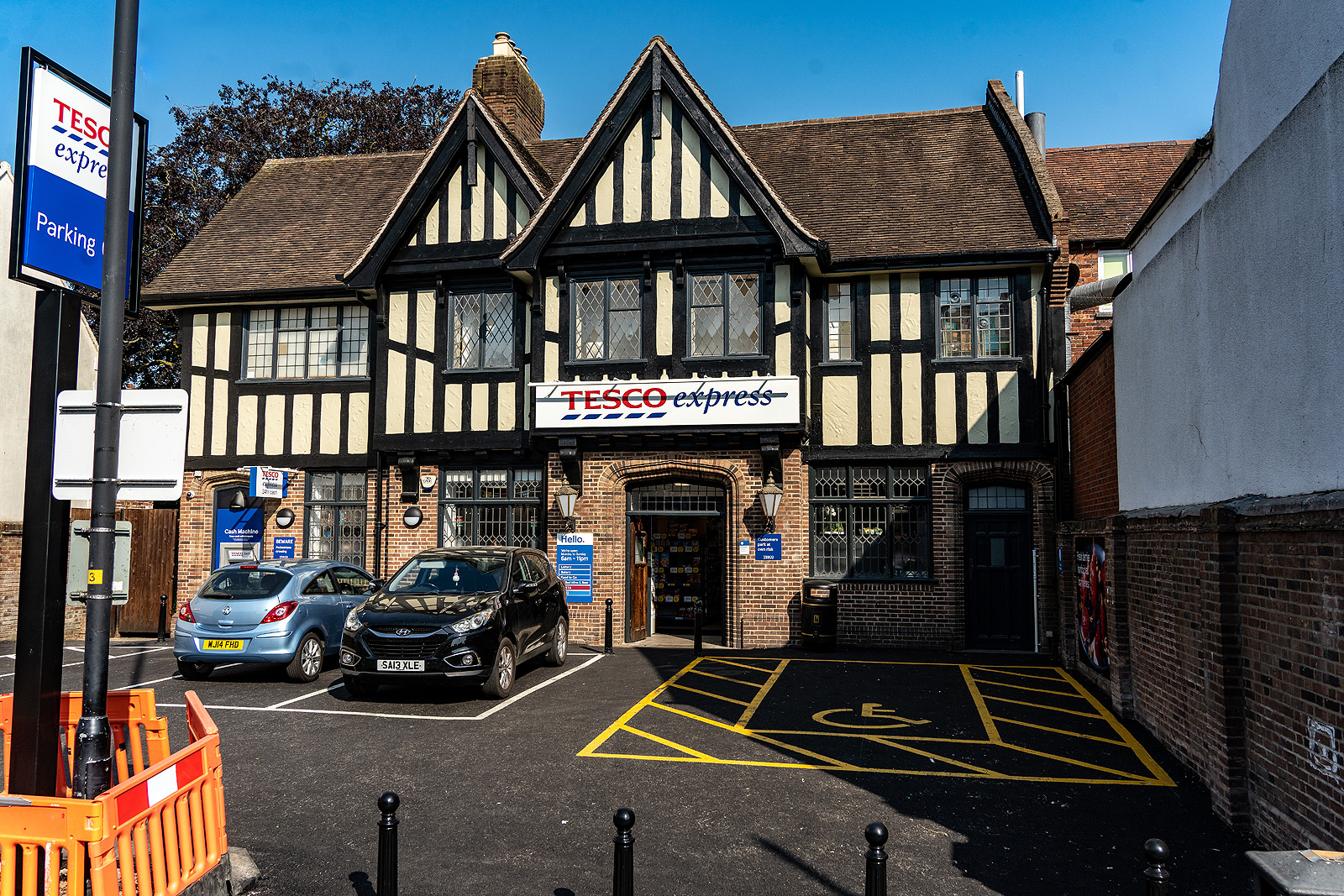
A Tesco Express store in Bewdley, Worcestershire, 2023

Tesco Express shops are neighbourhood convenience shops averaging 200 square metres (2,200 sq ft), stocking mainly food with an emphasis on higher-margin products such as sweets, crisps, chocolate, biscuits, fizzy drinks, and processed food, alongside everyday essentials. This is due to small shop size, and the necessity to maximize revenue per square foot.

The exterior of a Tesco Express in Sevenoaks, Kent, 2026

They are located in busy city-centre districts, small shopping precincts in residential areas, small towns, and villages, and on Esso petrol station forecourts. In 2010, it became known that Tesco was operating Express pricing, charging more in its Express branches than in its other stores. A spokesperson said that this was "because of the difference in costs of running the smaller shops".

==== Fuel stations ====
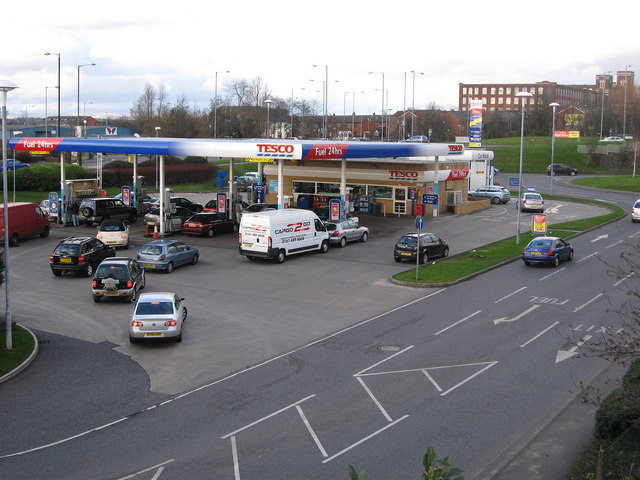
A 24-hour Tesco petrol station in Oldham, Greater Manchester, England, 2009

Tesco first started selling petrol in 1974. Tesco sells 95, 97, and 99 RON petrol, a fuel developed by Greenergy of which Tesco is a shareholder, from forecourts at most Superstore and Extra locations. Tesco recently diversified into biofuels, offering petrol-bioethanol and diesel-biodiesel blends instead of pure petrol and diesel at its petrol stations, and now offering Greenergy 100% biodiesel at many shops in the southeast of the United Kingdom.

In 1998, Tesco and Esso (part of ExxonMobil) formed a business alliance that included several petrol filling stations on lease from Esso, with Tesco operating the attached shops under its Express format. Esso operates the forecourts and sells fuel via the Tesco shop. As of 2013, there were 200 joint Tesco Express/Esso sites in the UK.

==== Online ====
In the United Kingdom Tesco operates a home shopping service through the Tesco.com website. In May 1984, in Gateshead, England, Mrs. Jane Snowball used a piece of computer technology called "Videotex" on her television to purchase groceries from her local Tesco shop in the world's first recorded online shopping transaction from the home. As of November 2006, Tesco was the only food retailer to make online shopping profitable.

In January 2023, Tesco opened its sixth Urban Fulfilment Centre (UFC) at Bar Hill Extra in Cambridgeshire. UFCs are attached to large stores and serve as dedicated picking hubs for home delivery and click and collect orders.

==== Loyalty card ====
In 1995, Tesco launched its customer loyalty scheme, the Tesco Clubcard. It has been cited as a pivotal development in Tesco's progress towards becoming the UK's largest supermarket chain and one that fundamentally changed the country's supermarket business. Tesco was cited in a Wall Street Journal article as using the intelligence from the Clubcard to thwart Wal-Mart's initiatives in the UK.

Cardholders can collect one Clubcard point for every £1 (or one point for €1 in Ireland and Slovakia or 1 point for 1zł in Poland) they spend in a Tesco shop, or at Tesco.com, and 1 point per £2 on fuel (not in Slovakia). Customers can also collect points by paying with a Tesco Credit Card, or by using Tesco Mobile, Tesco Homephone, Tesco Broadband, selected Tesco Personal Finance products, or through Clubcard partners, E.ON and Avis. Each point equates to 1p in shops when redeemed, or up to four times that value when used with Clubcard deals (offers for holidays, day trips, etc.) Clubcard points (UK & IE) can also be converted to Avios and Virgin Atlantic frequent flyer miles.

=== One Stop ===
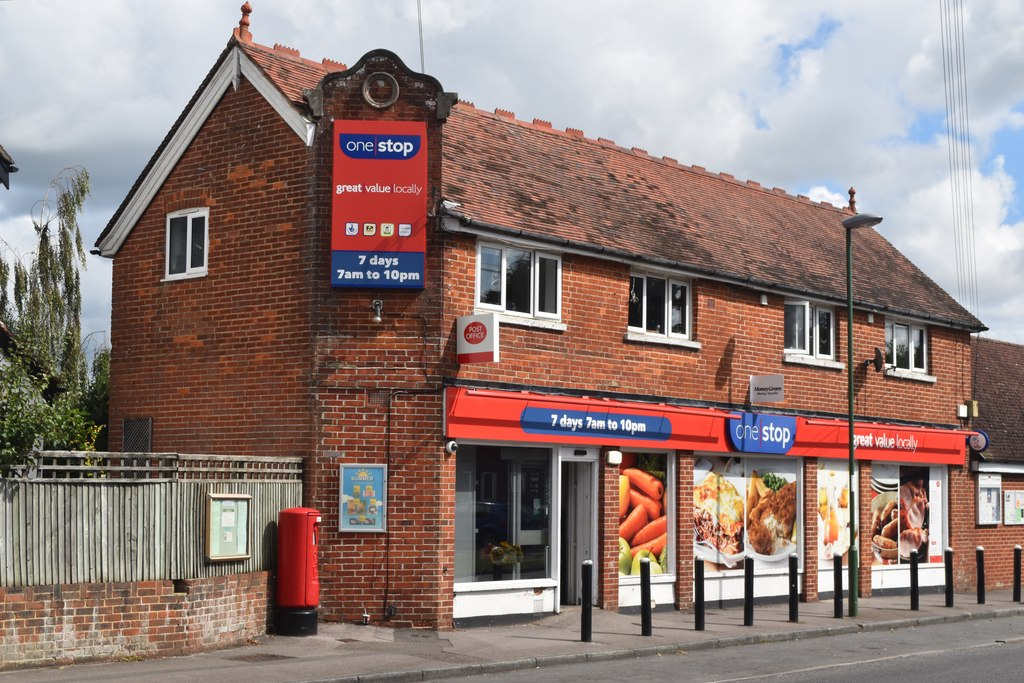
A One Stop in Chichester, 2023

One Stop, which includes some of the smallest shops, smaller than a Tesco Express, was the only Tesco shop format in the UK that did not include the word Tesco in its name, until 2018, when the first Jack's store opened. The brand, along with the original shops, formed part of the T&S Stores business. Unlike many that were converted to Tesco Express, these kept their old name. Other shops bought by Tesco have been converted to the One Stop brand. Some have Tesco Bank branded cash machines.

The business has attracted some controversy, as the prices of groceries in these shops, often situated in more impoverished areas, can be higher than nearby Tesco branded shops, highlighted in The Times 22 March 2010: "Britain's biggest supermarket uses its chain of 639 One Stop convenience shops – which many customers do not realize it owns – to charge up to 14 per cent more for goods than it does in Tesco-branded shops."

Tesco responded to the article stating "It is a separate business within the Tesco Group, with its own supply chain and distribution network. One Stop shops offer a different range to Express shops and its operating costs are different. One Stop's price strategy is to match to its nearest competitor, Costcutter, and is frequently cheaper."

== Subsidiaries ==
=== Booker Group ===
Tesco completed its acquisition of the food wholesaler Booker in March 2018. Booker also owns the Budgens, Londis, Euro Shopper, and Premier Stores brands which operate under franchises.

=== Tesco Bank ===
In the United Kingdom Tesco offers financial services through Tesco Bank, formerly a 50:50 joint venture with The Royal Bank of Scotland. Products on offer include credit cards, loans, mortgages, savings accounts, and several types of insurance, including car, home, life, and travel. They are promoted by leaflets in Tesco's shops and through its website. The business made a profit of £130 million for the 52 weeks to 24 February 2007, of which Tesco's share was £66 million. This move towards the financial sector diversified the Tesco brand and provides opportunities for growth outside of the retailing sector. In July 2008, Tesco bought out the Royal Bank of Scotland's 50% stake in the company for £950 million.

=== F&F ===
F&F launched in 2001 as Florence & Fred in Tesco's UK and Ireland supermarkets. In 2010, the brand started to open stores in of itself starting with a London store. In the early to mid-2010s, it expanded to multiple countries stores and online.

In the UK, F&F had its own website until 2016 when it was folded into Tesco Direct - which itself folded in August 2018. After this, F&F had no online UK presence until it partnered with Next PLC a year later. Tesco launched a scaled-down F&F on Tesco.com soon after its deal with Next.

=== Tesco Mobile ===
Tesco operates a mobile phone business across the United Kingdom, Ireland, Slovakia, Hungary, and the Czech Republic. It launched in the UK in 2003 as a joint venture with O2. It operates as a mobile virtual network operator (MVNO) using the network of O2. In Hungary, the network of Vodafone Hungary is used. In Ireland, Three Ireland is used. As a virtual operator, Tesco Mobile does not own or operate its own network infrastructure. In January 2011 Tesco had over 2.5 million UK mobile customers.

Tesco operated a home telephone and broadband business. Its broadband service was launched in August 2004 to complement its existing internet service provider business, providing an ADSL-based service delivered via BT phone lines. In January 2015, Tesco sold its home telephone and broadband business, together with Blinkbox, to TalkTalk for around £5 million. Its customers were transferred by 2016.

=== Tesco Marketplace ===
Tesco Marketplace is an online shopping platform designed to offer its customers a wider range of items than Tesco's traditional grocery product line and become a "one-stop shop". In the first eight months following its launch, Tesco Marketplace expanded significantly, offering over 300,000 SKUs compared to 9,000 SKUs on its launch date.

Unlike Tesco's grocery operations, Tesco Marketplace products are fulfilled and delivered directly by the online sellers. Using third-party sellers, the marketplace format allows customers to purchase from a range of categories including pet care, beauty, homeware, DIY, gardening, toys, baby and toddler, electrics, furniture, and many more. Customers can also collect Clubcard points with purchases from Tesco Marketplace.

=== Tesco Real Food ===
Tesco Real Food is Tesco's owned-and-operated recipe and food inspiration website. It was launched in 2010 to accompany the Tesco recipe magazine.

=== Tesco Tech Support ===
Tesco acquired a small I.T. support company called The PC Guys in 2007, and were able to launch Tesco Tech Support in December 2008.

== Former operations ==
=== Tesco Home 'n' Wear ===
In the 1960s, Tesco set up a non-food division, Tesco Home 'n' Wear, headed by Leslie Porter. It had stand-alone shops and departments in larger shops, and from 1975 a distribution centre in Milton Keynes. Although Tesco continued to stock non-food items the stand-alone shops were closed and the name was no longer in use when Tesco Extra was launched.

=== Tesco Homeplus ===
In May 2005, Tesco announced a trial non-food only format near Manchester and Aberdeen. The first shop opened in October 2005. The shops offered all of Tesco's ranges except food in warehouse-style units in retail parks. Tesco introduced the format as only 20% of its customers had access to a Tesco Extra, and the company was restricted in how many of its superstores it could convert into Extras and how quickly it could do so. Large units for non-food retailing are much more readily available. The format was not Tesco's first non-food-only venture in the UK. Until the late 1990s/early 2000s there were several non-food Tesco shops around the country, including Scarborough and Yate.

Although not in a warehouse-style format, the shops were located on high streets and shopping centres and stocked similar items to Homeplus shops. In both cases, this was because another part of the shopping centre had a Tesco Superstore that stocked food items only. By 2014, the number of Homeplus shops in the United Kingdom had reached 12. The newest shop opened in Chester in July 2009. In 2012 it was reported that Tesco was looking to close the business to focus on groceries. Tesco closed six Homeplus shops in March 2015, and the remaining six shops closed in June 2015.

=== Tesco Metro ===
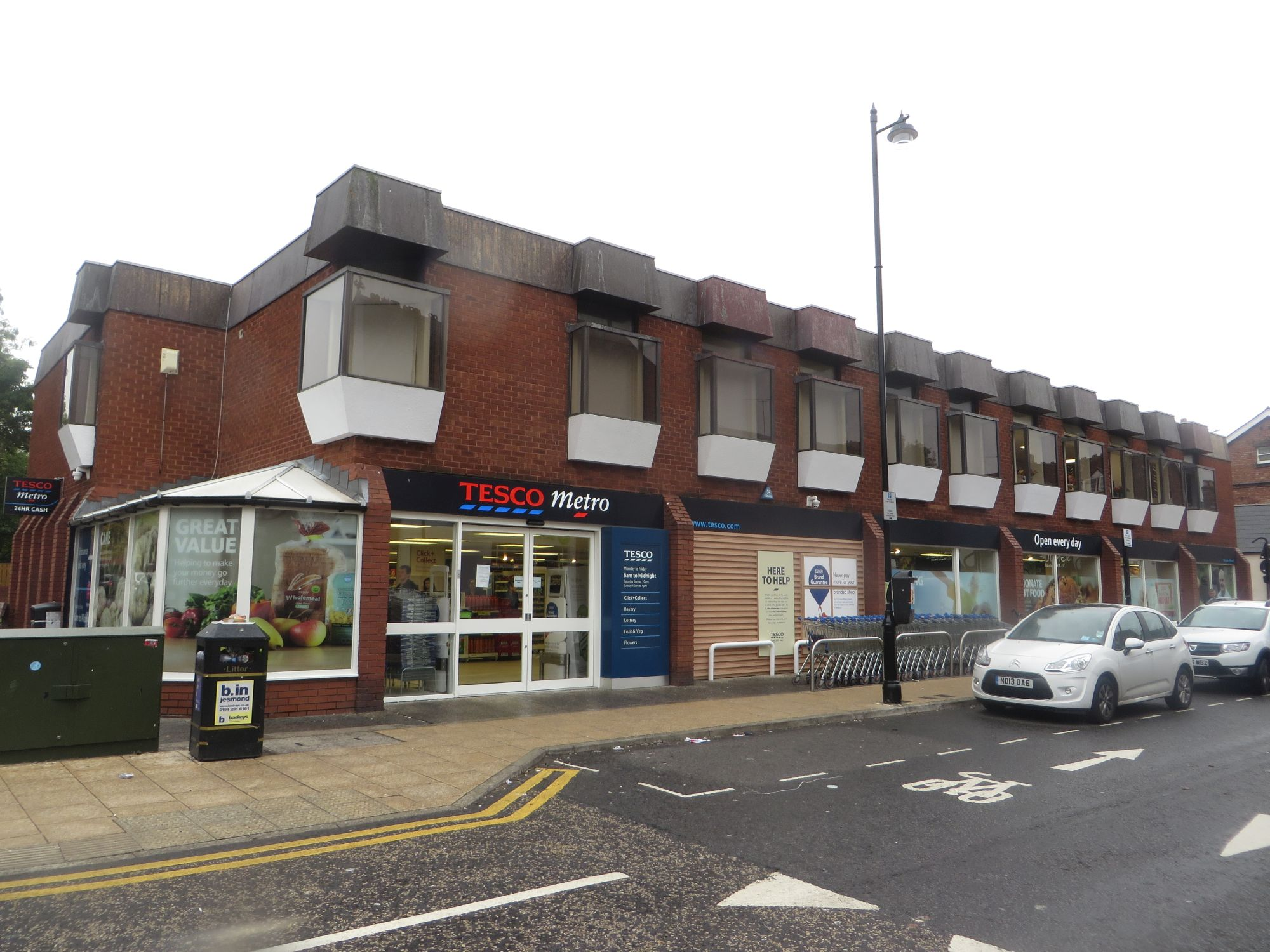
Tesco Metro in Jesmond, Newcastle upon Tyne, England, 2016

Tesco Metro shops were sized between Tesco superstores and Tesco Express shops, averaging 1,000 square metres (11,000 sq ft). They were mainly located in town centres and other urban locations and were designed to accommodate larger weekly shops as well as top-up shopping.

In May 2021, Tesco retired the brand, as only 31% of customers were using the stores for larger shops. 89 locations converted to the Tesco Express format. The remaining 58 adopted the standard superstore format.

=== Dobbies Garden Centres ===
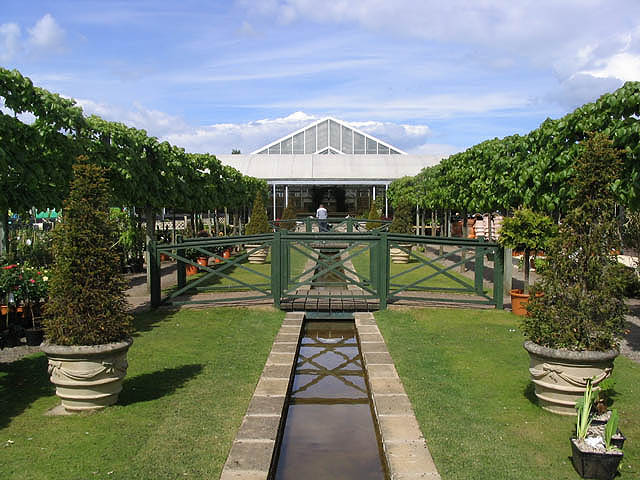
Dobbies Garden Centre in Lasswade, Scotland, 2007

Dobbies is a chain of garden centres across Scotland, England, and Northern Ireland. Tesco completed its acquisition of Dobbies in 2008. The company continued to trade under its own brand, from its own head office in Melville, near Edinburgh. In June 2016, Tesco sold the company to a group of investors led by Midlothian Capital Partners and Hattington Capital for £217 million.

=== Harris + Hoole ===
In 2012, Tesco invested in a new coffee shop chain, named Harris + Hoole after coffee-loving characters in Samuel Pepys' diary. In February 2016, Tesco took full ownership of the business from its founders Nick, Andrew and Laura Tolley. In June 2016, Tesco sold it to Caffè Nero.

=== Giraffe ===
Giraffe is a restaurant chain in the United Kingdom which Tesco purchased in March 2013 as part of a strategy of making use of excess space in its shops. In June 2016, Tesco sold the chain to Boparan Holdings.

=== Euphorium Bakery ===
Euphorium Bakery opened a concession in Tesco's Kensington shop in 2012, and in 2013 Tesco bought a stake in the business. It purchased the remaining stake in April 2015. In August 2016, Tesco sold Euphorium's high street shops and factory in Islington to Soho Coffee, and its factory in Weybridge to Samworth Brothers.

=== Jack's ===
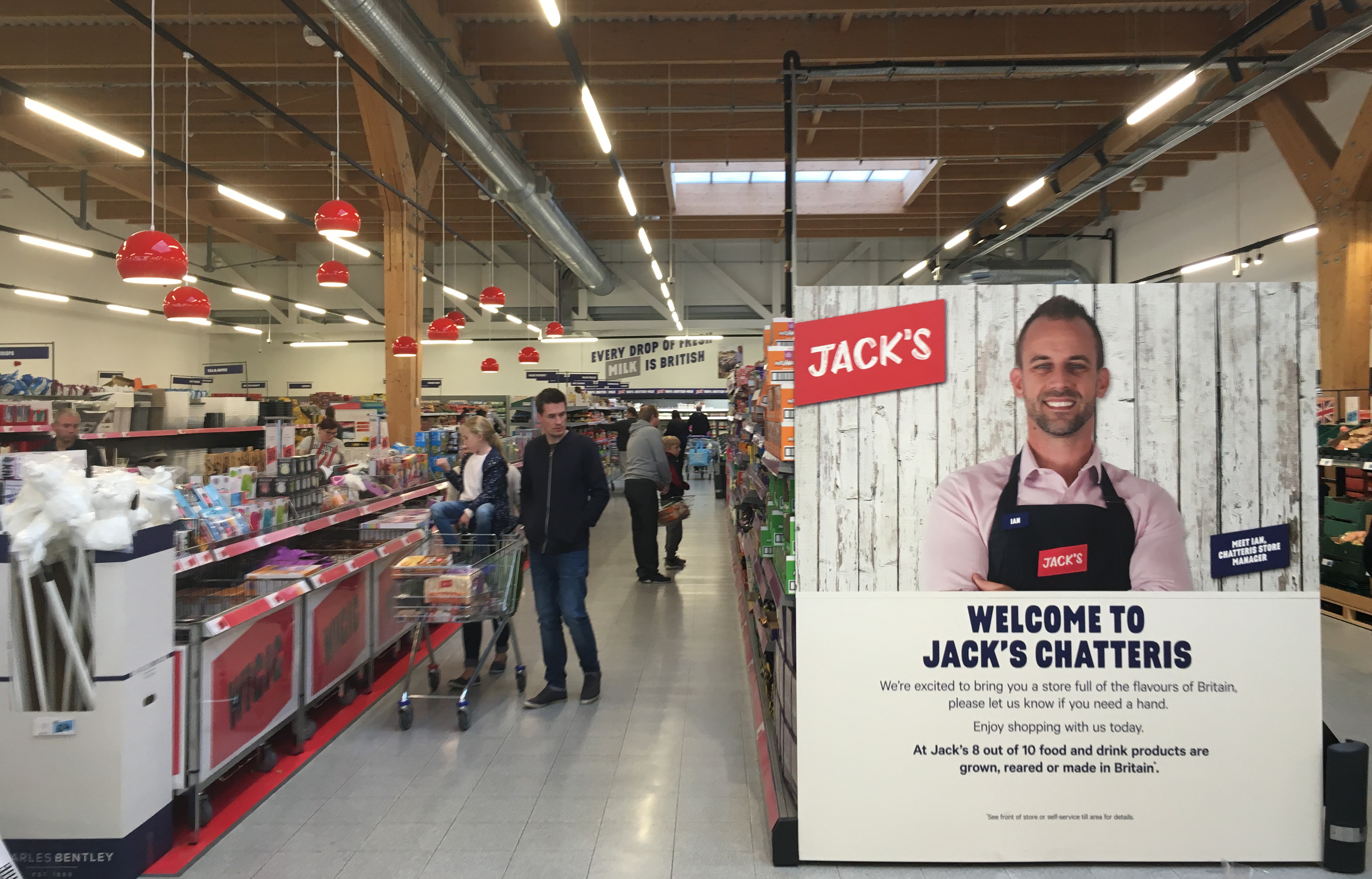
Jack's supermarket in Chatteris, Cambridgeshire, England, the first store using this brand to open in September 2018

In 2018, Tesco launched a separate budget chain, Jack's, to compete with Lidl and Aldi. The first store opened in Chatteris, Cambridgeshire in September 2018. In January 2022, Tesco shut down its Jack's stores, with stores either being closed or converted to Tesco Superstores.

== International operations ==
Tesco expanded its operations from the United Kingdom to 11 other countries. Tesco pulled out of the United States in 2013, but continued to see growth elsewhere. Tesco's international expansion strategy has responded to the need to be sensitive to local expectations in other countries by entering into joint ventures with local partners, such as Samsung Group in South Korea (Samsung-Tesco Home plus), and Charoen Pokphand in Thailand (Tesco Lotus), appointing a very high proportion of local personnel to management positions. Tesco also makes small acquisitions as part of its strategy: for example, in its 2005/2006 financial year, it made acquisitions in South Korea, one in Poland, and one in Japan.

=== Operations ===
The following table shows the number of stores for Tesco's international operations.

Country	Entered	Stores	+/- stores	Area	Mean store area
Czech Republic	1996	298	▼1	389,100 m^{2} (4,188,000 sq ft)	1,305.70 m^{2} (14,054.4 sq ft)
Hungary	1994	200	▲2	491,700 m^{2} (5,293,000 sq ft)	2,458.50 m^{2} (26,463.1 sq ft)
Ireland	1997	191	▲9	340,300 m^{2} (3,663,000 sq ft)	1,781.68 m^{2} (19,177.8 sq ft)
Slovakia	1996	182	▲3	296,000 m^{2} (3,190,000 sq ft)	1,626.37 m^{2} (17,506.1 sq ft)
Total		871	▲13	1,517,100 m^{2} (16,330,000 sq ft)	1,741.79 m^{2} (18,748.5 sq ft)

==== Czech Republic ====
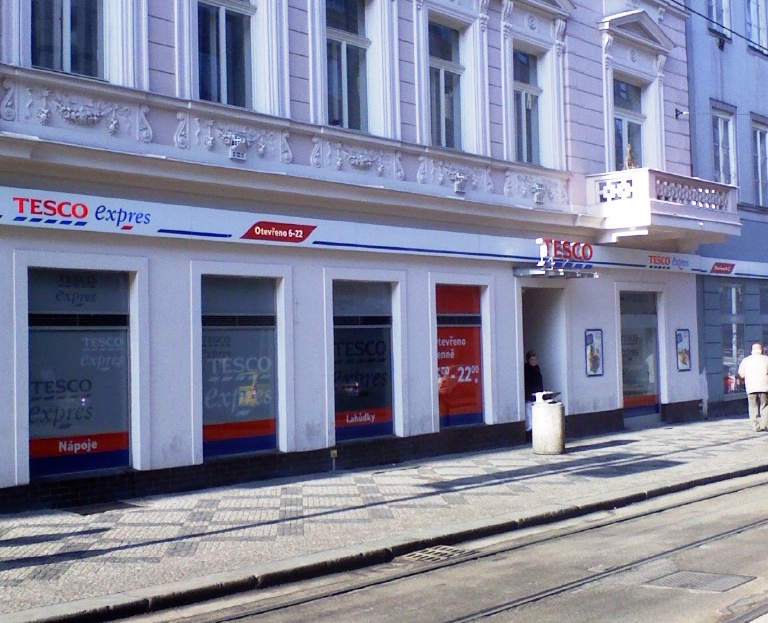
A local Tesco Express, known as Tesco Expres in Belehradska Street, Prague, Czech Republic

In 1996, Tesco expanded to the Czech Republic when they purchased Kmart's local operations for $117.5 million and rebranded the stores as Tesco. In December 2005, Tesco expanded its operations in the country by purchasing Carrefour's local operations.

Tesco has been a market leader within the Czech Republic and is one of the largest supermarket chains in the country, operating over 322 stores by 2012, upwards of 300 by 2007. Tesco is keen to expand non-food items and has already opened petrol stations and offers personal finance services in the Czech Republic.

==== Hungary ====
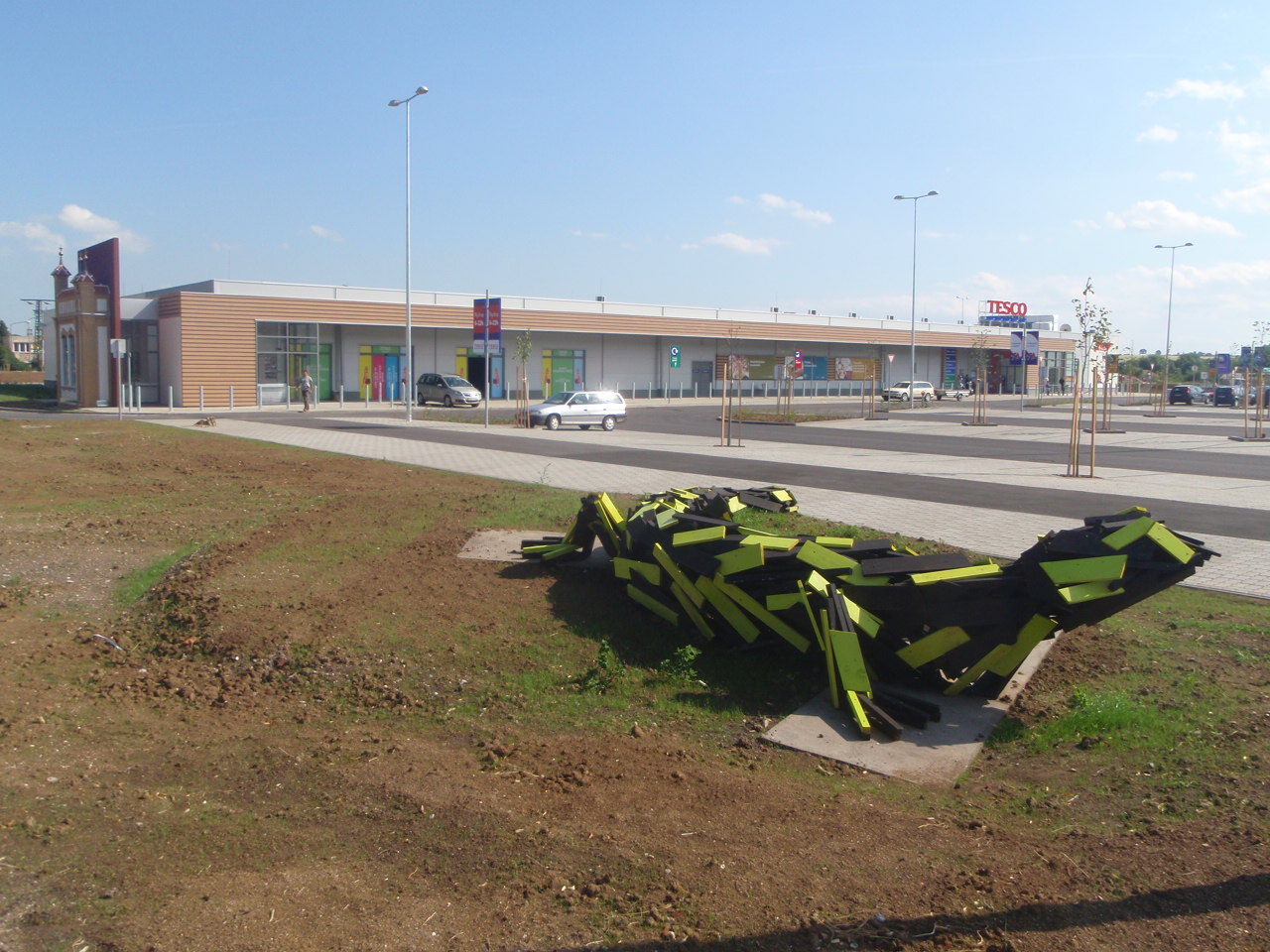
Tesco store at Kőszeg, Hungary with Statue of Fire Salamander, 2011

In 1994, Tesco entered Hungary when the company purchased the Győr-based chain S-Market. Currently, Tesco operates through more than 200 stores in Hungary with further openings planned. Tesco Hungary also offers a clothing line and personal finance services.

==== Slovakia ====
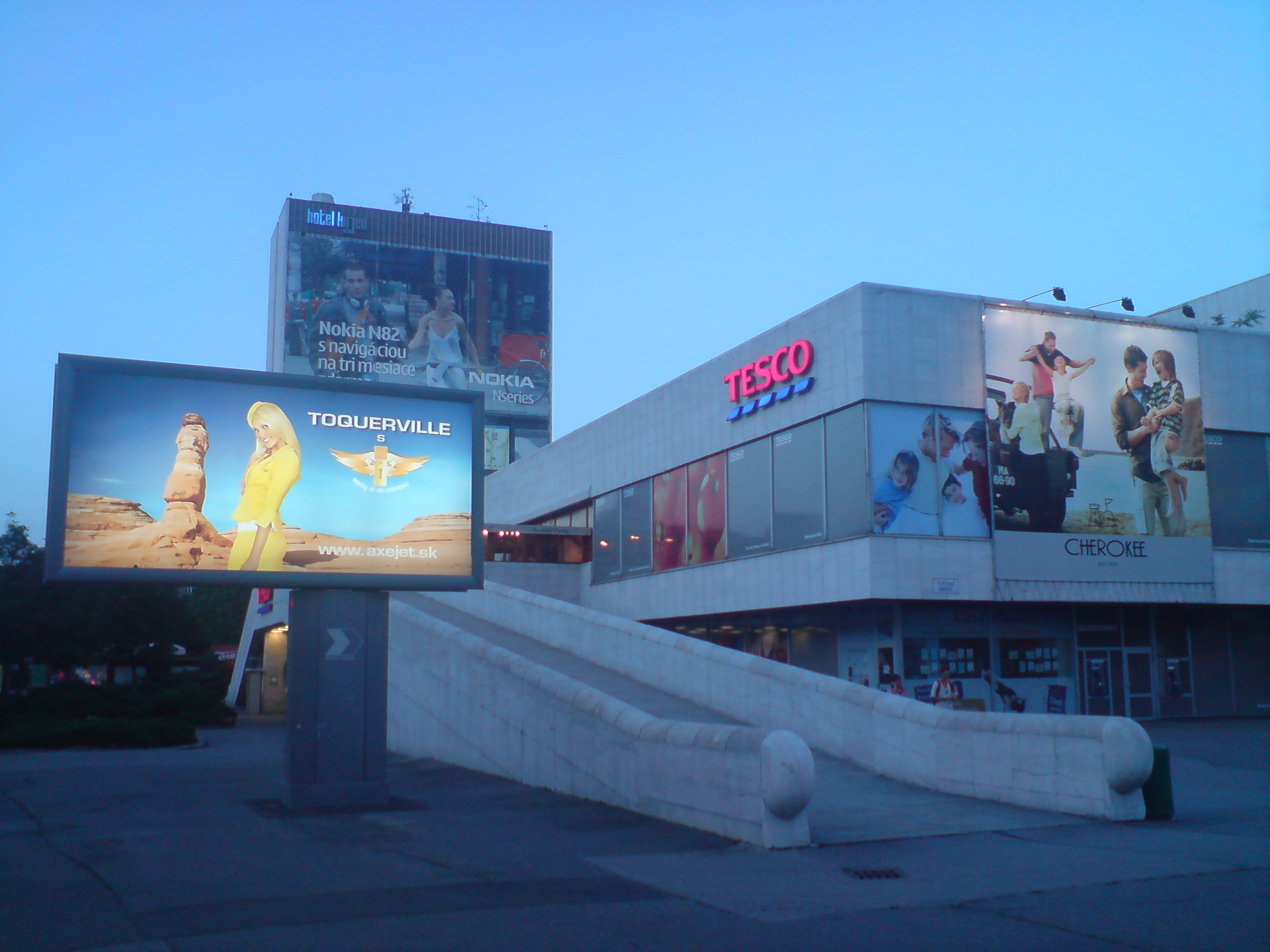
Tesco in Bratislava, Slovakia, 2008

In 1996, Tesco entered the Slovak market by purchasing Kmart's local operations.

Tesco Slovakia caused controversy amongst the Slovak government when it was found to have come foul of food safety laws in 2006.

In April 2010 the first Tesco Extra in Central Europe opened in Bratislava – Petržalka, Slovakia as part of a pilot project for Tesco in the region, including the first self-service cash flow in Central Europe. There are currently seven Tesco Extra stores in Slovakia – three in Bratislava and one each in Zvolen, Trnava, Banská Bystrica and Spišská Nová Ves.

==== Ireland ====
In the early 1980s, Tesco first operated in the Irish grocery market, selling its operations there in March 1986. In 1997, Tesco re-entered the Irish market after the purchase of Power Supermarkets Ltd, which operated the Quinnsworth chain of supermarkets. It now operates from 154 stores across Ireland. Like Tesco stores in the UK, these offer a home delivery shopping service available to 80% of the Irish population as well as petrol, mobile telephone, personal finance, flower delivery service, and a weight-loss programme. Tesco's loyalty programme, Clubcard, is offered in Ireland. Tesco had approximately 21% of the Irish grocery market in 2019 and its main competitors are Dunnes Stores and SuperValu.

Tesco Ireland claims to be the largest purchaser of Irish food, with an estimated €1.5 billion annually. Tesco Ireland operates a number of Tesco Extra hypermarkets in Ireland, with Clarehall Extra on the Malahide Road being the first to open in 2006. In November 2010, Tesco's largest hypermarket store in Europe opened in Dundalk in County Louth, with a floorspace of 18,500 m^{2} (199,000 sq ft).

In April 2011, the Irish Times said that "Increasingly, Ireland is being viewed as a provincial backwater by the parent company – albeit a very profitable little backwater – and all the strategic decisions are being taken in the UK.

In 2008, Tesco opened its first eco store in Tramore, County Waterford. It is expected to use 45% less energy than other Tesco supermarkets of similar size.

==== Iberia ====
Under a partnership with Tenerife-based company Overseas Imports, Tesco supplies products for their "The Food Co." chain, which operates through Spain, Portugal, Gibraltar and the Canary Islands, with the first store opening in 2019 in Puerto de Mazarrón, located in the Murcia province of Spain. Their first store in Portugal opened the following year.

==== India ====
Tesco has had a limited presence in India with a service centre in Bangalore, and outsourcing. In 2008, Tesco announced its intention to invest an initial £60m (US$115m) to open a wholesale cash-and-carry business based in Mumbai with the assistance of the Tata Group. In 2014, the joint venture between Tesco and Tata was confirmed, where investment by the earlier was reportedly 140 million dollars, becoming the first foreign supermarket to enter India. The stores operate under the banner Star Bazaar and Star Daily supermarkets.

==== Pakistan ====
In February 2017, Tesco announced a wholesale partnership with Limestone Private Limited, owner of the Alpha Superstores chain. This involved an exclusive partnership which would see Tesco products stocked across Alpha Supermarket stores within Pakistan.

=== Former operations ===
Country	Entered	Exited	Stores	Area (m^{2} (sq ft))	Mean store area (m^{2} (sq ft))
France	1993	2010	92 at peak, 1 from 1997 to 2010	173,279 (1,870,000)	937 (10,108)
Japan	2003	2012	121	36,790 (396,000)	304 (3,273)
Malaysia	2002	2021	71	350,988 (3,778,000)	7,800 (83,956)
Poland	1995	2021	429	827,394 (8,906,000)	2,008 (21,617)
South Korea	1999	2015	458	1,166,026 (12,551,000)	2,546 (27,404)
Thailand	1998	2021	1,914	1,192,039 (12,831,000)	1,092 (11,750)
Turkey	2003	2016	191	337,052 (3,628,000)	2,277 (24,514)
United States	2007	2013	185	173,279 (1,870,000)	937 (10,108)

==== China ====
In September 2004, Tesco acquired a 50% stake in the Hymall chain from Ting Hsin. In December 2006, it raised its stake to 90% in a £180 million deal.

In 2007, Tesco began opening new stores under its name in the country, beginning with Beijing. In its peak, most of their stores were based around Shanghai. Tesco had a large store in Weifang, Shandong province, and a further two-floor store in Taizhou, Jiangsu province. Tesco had been increasing its own brand products into the Chinese market as well as introducing the Tesco Express format.

In August 2013, Tesco announced that they were in talks to merge their Chinese operations with the state-run China Resources Enterprise (CRE) to create a joint venture, which would combine their 131 stores with CRE's nearly 3,000 outlets. The venture was officially announced in October, with Tesco holding a 20% stake and was closed in May 2014.

In February 2020, Tesco announced it would completely exit the Chinese market and sell its 20% stake in the venture to CRE for £275 million.

==== France ====
In 1992, Tesco invested 72% in French retailer Catteau, which operated a chain of 92 stores in NE France under the Cedico, Hyper Cedico and Cedimarche banners. In December 1997, Tesco sold Catteau to Promodès following major profit losses and to focus more on its then-new Central Europe division.

Also in 1997, Tesco opened up a store named "Vin Plus" in Calais which mostly sold wine, beer, and spirits. In June 2010, Tesco announced that the store would close permanently at the end of August, citing the decline of the booze cruise as the reason.

==== Hong Kong ====
In April 2015, Tesco entered into a joint-venture with China Resources Vanguard to operate a range of convenience stores entitled "U Select".

==== India ====
Tesco has had a limited presence in India with a service centre in Bangalore, and outsourcing.

In 2008, Tesco announced their intention to invest an initial £60m ($115m) to open a wholesale cash-and-carry business based in Mumbai with the assistance of the Tata Group. In 2014, the joint venture between Tesco and Tata was confirmed, where investment by the earlier was reportedly 140 million dollars, becoming the first foreign supermarket to enter India. The stores are now operated under the banner Star Bazaar and Star Daily supermarkets.

==== Japan ====
Tesco had an interest in entering the Japanese market as early as 2000. In June 2003, Tesco purchased C Two-Network for £139 million. C Two-Network owned a Japanese supermarket chain called Tsurukame, which had 78 mid-sized stores based within Tokyo. In April 2004, Tesco purchased the bankrupt supermarket chain Fre'c. These stores, also based within Tokyo, would be folded under C-Two Network and rebranded under the Tsurukame name, expanding Tesco's operations in Japan to 104 stores. An additional eight stores were added in October 2005 when Tanekin Supermarket was purchased.

In April 2007, C-Two Network opened up its first Tesco Express store in Japan, intending to open up 35 new Tesco and Tsurukame stores by 2008. In September, C Two-Network Co, Ltd. was renamed to Tesco Japan Co, Ltd. and later launched a range of software. In December 2009, the first Tesco supermarkets opened in Japan. By August 2011, 29 supermarkets were in operation.

In August 2011, Tesco announced that it would exit the Japanese market and sell a 50% stake of Tesco Japan to ÆON for £40 million. It was revealed that only half of Tesco Japan's stores in Greater Tokyo Area were making a profit and that the market share in Japan was never above 1 percent. In December 2012, ÆON purchased out the remainder stake in Tesco Japan for a minimal 1 yen share and became a fully owned subsidiary. In March 2013, Tesco Japan Co, Ltd. was renamed ÆON Every Co, Ltd. with all Tesco branded stores rebranded under the Acore name. At the end of March 2014, ÆON Every's remaining stores were closed or sold, and the company ceased operations.

==== Malaysia ====
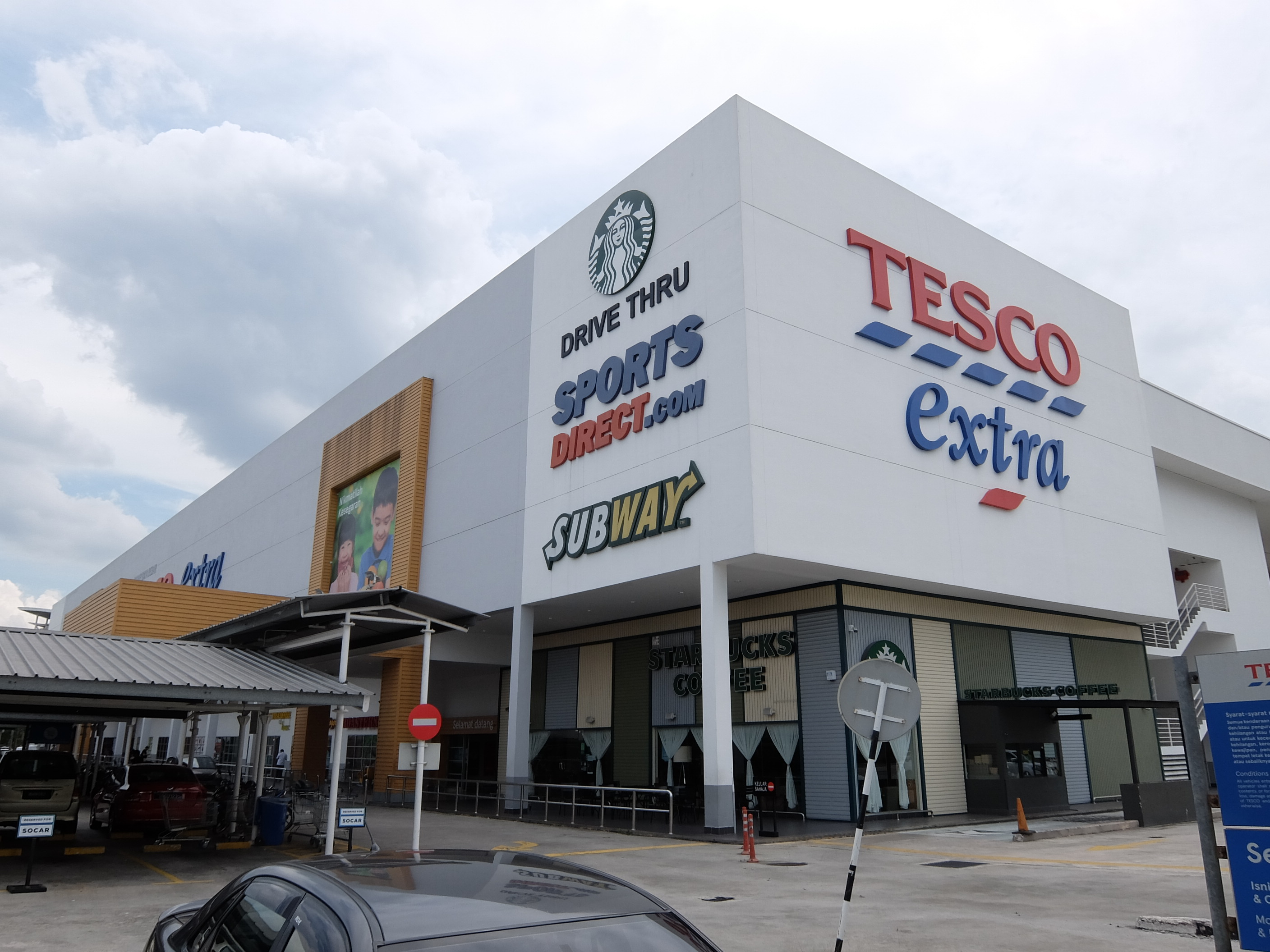
Tesco Extra in Johor Bahru, Malaysia, 2019

In December 2000, Tesco entered into a joint venture with trading conglomerate Sime Darby Berhad to operate Tesco-branded Hypermarkets in Malaysia. Tesco would own 70% of the venture, while Sime Darby would own 30%. The first hypermarket opened in May 2002 in Puchong, Selangor with intentions to open 13 stores in five years. In December 2006, Tesco purchased the local operations of Dutch supermarket chain Makro for £80 million and rebranded them under the Tesco Extra name.

By 2012, Tesco Malaysia operated 49 stores that were branded under the Tesco and Tesco Extra names. In April 2013, Tesco Malaysia launched the Grocery Home Shopping Service, where it delivered groceries ordered via the Internet to consumers, with no minimum purchase imposed. In February 2015, Tesco Malaysia expanded to the convenience store market and opened up their first Tesco Ekspres store.

In March 2020, Tesco sold Tesco Malaysia to the Thailand-based Charoen Pokphand Group for US$10.6bn, including debt, in a deal that included the Thailand operations. In April, Sime Darby agreed to sell their 30% stake in Tesco Malaysia to Charoen Pokphand and Tesco for RM300 million. After the deals closed, the chain was rebranded as Lotus's.

==== Pakistan ====
In February 2017, Tesco announced a wholesale partnership with Limestone Private, owner of the Alpha Superstores chain. This involved an exclusive partnership which would see Tesco products stocked across Alpha Supermarket stores within Pakistan.

==== Poland ====
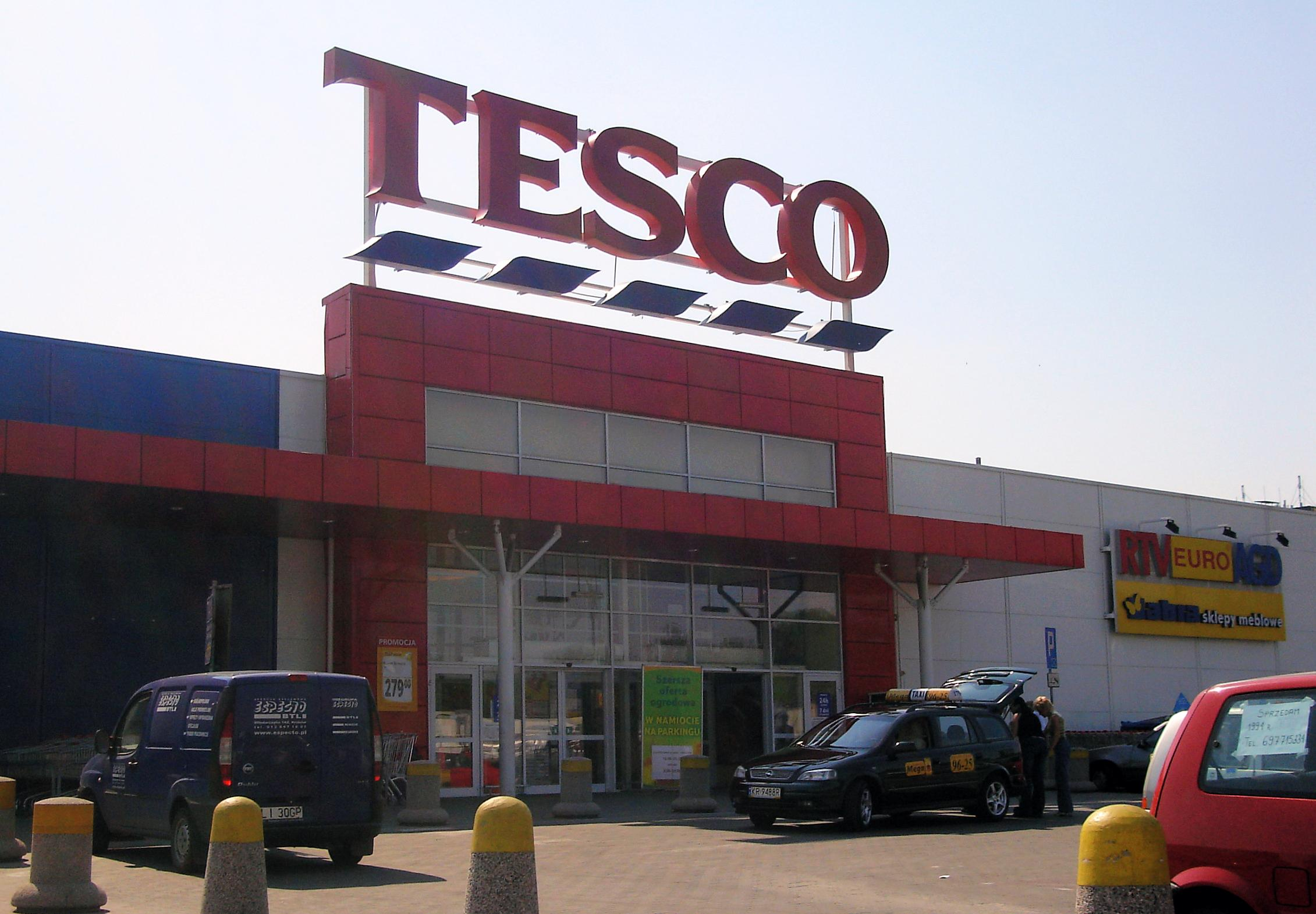
Tesco in Kraków, Poland, 2006

In 1995, Tesco entered the Polish market after acquiring the local chains Minor, Madex, and Savia. The company opened its first hypermarket in Wrocław Bielany in 1998. At the height of its operations in Poland the company operated from over 450 various format stores as well as an online shopping service.

In November 2019, having suffered years of net losses and despite extensive cost-cutting and attempts at streamlining its business model, Tesco announced it would exit the Polish market and sell its entire operations. In June 2020, the Salling Group acquired Tesco Poland's operations, consisting of 301 stores and two logistics centres for £181 million. After the sale, Salling announced they would close 58 stores and rebrand the remaining 243 as Netto, of which it would expand Netto's Polish operations to over 700 stores. The rebranding and closures were done in phases, with the last stores closing in October 2021.

==== South Korea ====
In April 1999, Tesco entered into a 51-49% joint venture with Samsung C&T Corporation entitled Tesco-Samsung, with the latter's supermarket chain Homeplus merging under it. Over the years, Tesco became the majority owner of the business. By 2008, they held Tesco held 94% of the shares in the venture. It was the second largest retailer in South Korea, just behind Shinsegae Group.

In May 2008, Tesco purchased 36 hypermarkets with a combination of food and non-food products from E-Land for $1.9 billion (£976 million) in its biggest single acquisition, making Tesco the second largest in the country. A majority of the E-Land stores formerly belonged to French retailer Carrefour before 2006, and most of the stores were converted to Homeplus outlets. By that time, Homeplus had 66 outlets. In February 2011, The Tesco-Samsung venture was renamed as Homeplus Co, Ltd. In July, Samsung C&T sold their remaining 5.32% stake to Tesco, making Homeplus a fully owned subsidiary.

In September 2015, Tesco sold Homeplus to MBK Partners, a South Korean buyout firm, which partnered with a Canadian pension fund and Singapore's Temasek Holdings in a transaction worth 4.2 billion pounds.

==== Taiwan ====
Tesco entered the Taiwanese market in 2000. The chain struggled to survive a saturated market led by other supermarket chains. In September 2005, Tesco announced it would pull out of the market and sell its operations to Carrefour in exchange for their stores in the Czech Republic and Slovakia. Both companies stated that they would focus their efforts on countries with strong market positions.

==== Thailand ====
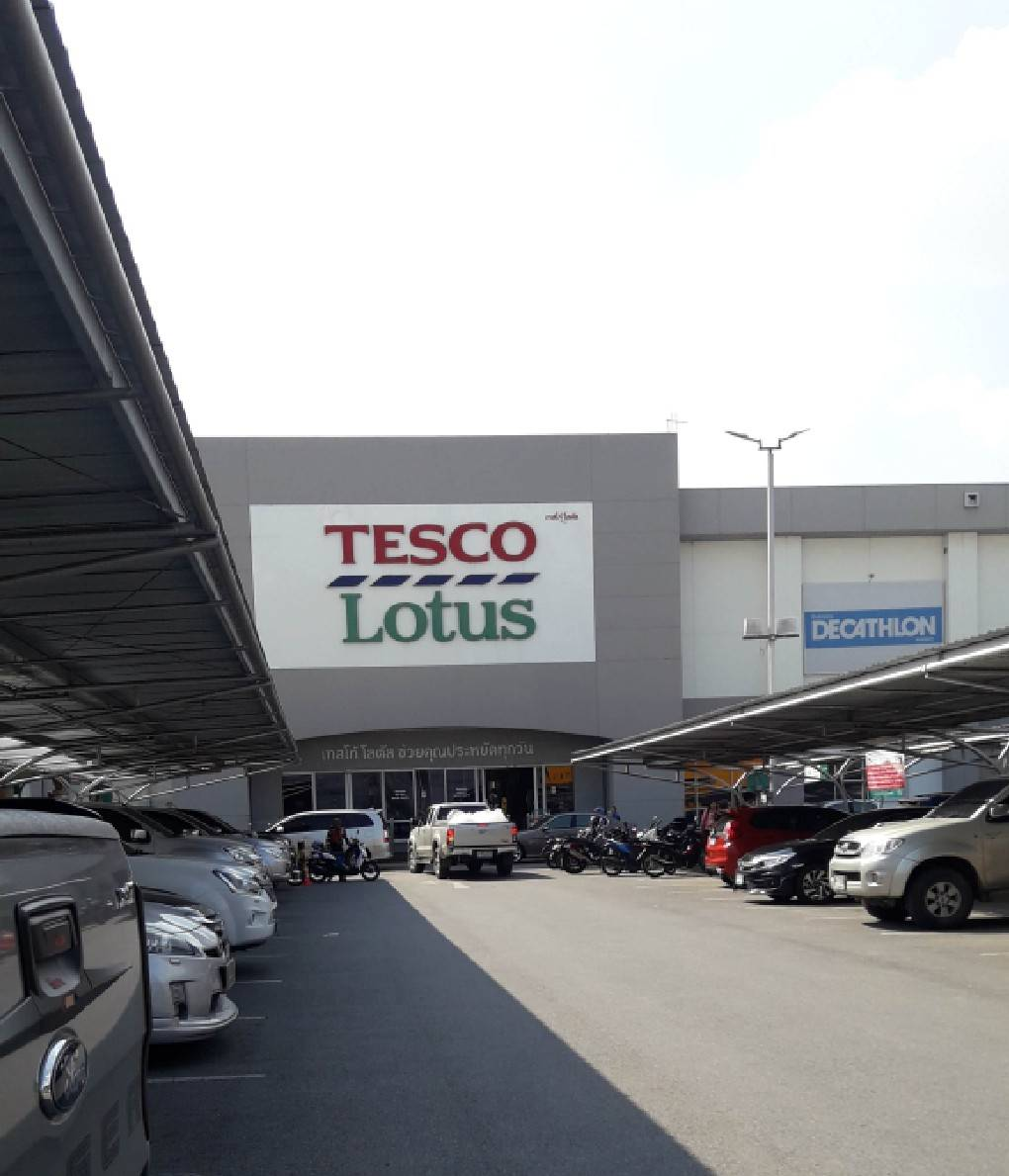
A Tesco Lotus Hypermarket in Pathum Thani, Thailand, 2021

In 1998, Tesco entered Thailand when they purchased a stake in the Lotus Supercenter chain from Charoen Pokphand in the midst of the 1997 Asian financial crisis. Renamed to Tesco Lotus Supercenter and later simply Tesco Lotus, The two companies operated Tesco Lotus under a joint-venture known as Ek-Chai Distribution. In February 2004, Tesco owned 90% in the business and planned on purchasing out Charoen Pokphand's remaining stake.

By 2009, Tesco Lotus operated 380 stores, claiming to serve 20 million customers every month and that 97% of its goods were sourced from Thailand. By March 2013, the Thailand operations were generating £3 billion in revenues and was one of Tesco's largest businesses outside of the UK. In 2014, Tesco Lotus expanded to the convenience store market with 365, aiming to compete with Family Mart and 7-Eleven in the country.

In March 2020, Tesco announced that it would sell Tesco Lotus back to Charoen Pokphand for US$10.6bn, including debt, in a deal that included Tesco's Malaysian operations. After the deal closed, Tesco Lotus was renamed Lotus's.

==== Turkey ====
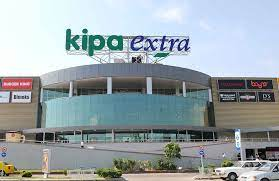
Kipa Extra store in Çiğli, İzmir, Turkey, 2023

In November 2003, Tesco announced its entry into the Turkish market by purchasing a stake in the Kipa supermarket chain for £75/£80 million. Talks between the two businesses of a possible merger were signalled as early as 2002. The business was renamed Tesco Kipa and began opening stores using the standard Tesco trading pattern as in the UK. In March 2006, the first Kipa Ekspres convenience stores opened in the country. By December 2008, Tesco Kipa operated 100 stores. The first Kipa Extra store opened in October 2010.

In February 2014, Tesco considered selling a stake in the business to BC Partners, the then-owners of Migros Türk, although the talks were held off in May. In June 2016, Tesco announced that they would exit Turkey and sell its 95.5% stake in Tesco Kipa to Migros Türk. The sale was completed in February 2017.

==== United States ====
Tesco entered the United States grocery market in 2007 through the opening of a new chain of convenience stores, named Fresh & Easy, on the West Coast (Arizona, California, and Nevada). The company established its U.S. headquarters in El Segundo, California. The first store opened in Hemet, California in November 2007, with 100 more planned in the first year, a store opening every two-and-a-half days.

The chain proved to be a financial failure for Tesco. In September 2013, the company announced that they would sell the chain and 150 of its stores to private equity firm Yucaipa Companies. The BBC reported that the remaining 50 stores were expected to close. The deal included Tesco loaning the venture £80m and retaining an option to buy back a stake in the business if Yucaipa succeeded in turning around the group's performance. Fresh & Easy filed for Chapter 11 Bankruptcy at the beginning of October.

The chain failed to make a change under new ownership, and in October 2015 it was announced that all remaining stores would close. The chain collapsed into bankruptcy the following week, the second in two years. Following this, the remainder of the chain was liquidated.

== Corporate affairs ==
=== Corporate strategy ===
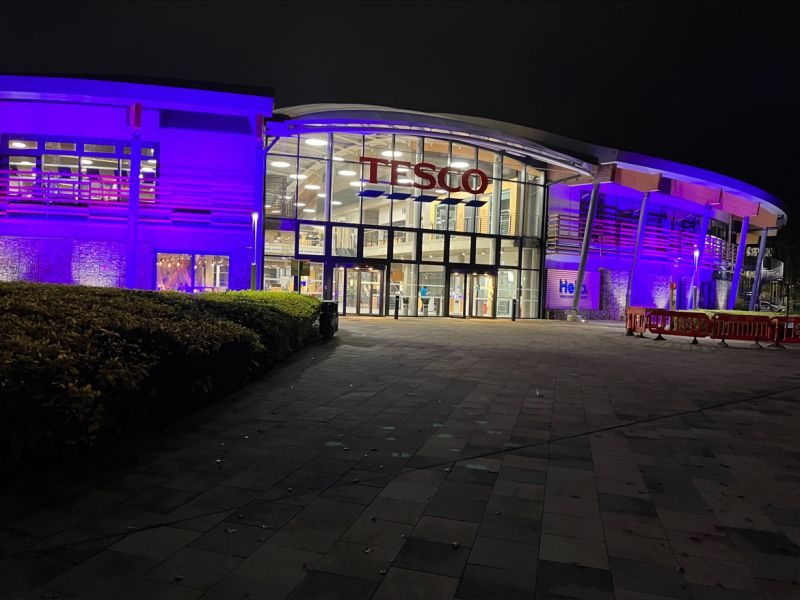
Tesco head office in Welwyn Garden City, Hertfordshire, England, 2023

According to Citigroup retail analyst David McCarthy, "[Tesco has] pulled off a trick that I'm not aware of any other retailer achieving. That is to appeal to all segments of the market". One plank of this strategy has been Tesco's use of its own-brand products, including the upmarket "Finest", mid-range Tesco brand and low-price "Value" encompassing several product categories such as food, beverage, home, clothing, Tesco Mobile and financial services. Tesco have two vegan ranges branded Plant Chef and Wicked Kitchen.

Beginning in 1997 when Terry Leahy took over as CEO, Tesco began marketing itself using the phrase "The Tesco Way" to describe the company's core purposes, values, principles, and goals This phrase became the standard marketing speak for Tesco as it expanded domestically and internationally under Leahy's leadership, implying a shift by the company to focus on people, both customers, and employees.

A core part of the Tesco expansion strategy has been its innovative use of technology. It was one of the first to build self-service tills and use cameras to reduce queues, and an early adopter of NFC contactless payment card technology. In 2016, Tesco developed a mobile payment wallet, PayQwiq using both NFC contactless and barcode technology to allow payment using mobile phones in-shop (along with supporting other contactless mobile wallets such as Apple Pay).

=== Financial performance ===
All figures below are for the Tesco financial years, which run for 52- or 53-week periods to late February.

52/3 weeks ended	Turnover (£m)	Profit before tax (£m)	Profit for year (£m)	Basic earnings per share (p)
28 February 2026	72,886	2,403	1,787	27.50
22 February 2025	69,191	2,215	1,604	23.79
24 February 2024	67,673	2,289	1,764	16.74
25 February 2023	65,762	2,076	744	10.05
26 February 2022	61,344	2,197	1,483	19.34
27 February 2021	57,887	825	6,147	63.80
29 February 2020	64,760	1,315	973	9.99
15 February 2019	63,911	1,674	1,320	13.65
25 February 2018	57,491	1,298	992	14.77
25 February 2017	55,917	145	(54)	(0.49)
28 February 2016	53,933	202	129	1.70
28 February 2015	62,284	(6,376)	(5,766)	(70.82)
22 February 2014	70,894	3,054	2,259	32.05
23 February 2013	64,826	3,549	3,453	35.97
25 February 2012	64,539	3,985	2,814	34.98
26 February 2011	67,573	3,535	2,671	33.10
27 February 2010	62,537	3,176	2,336	31.66
28 February 2009	54,300	3,128	2,166	28.92
23 February 2008	47,298	2,803	2,130	26.95
24 February 2007	46,600	2,653	1,899	22.36
25 February 2006	38,300	2,210	1,576	19.70
26 February 2005	33,974	1,962	1,366	17.44
28 February 2004	30,814	1,600	1,100	15.05
22 February 2003	26,337	1,361	946	13.54
23 February 2002	23,653	1,201	830	12.05
24 February 2001	20,988	1,054	767	11.29
26 February 2000	18,796	933	674	10.07
27 February 1999	17,158	842	606	9.14
28 February 1998	16,452	760	532	8.12

Despite being in a recession, Tesco made record profits for a British retailer in the year to February 2010, during which its underlying pre-tax profits increased by 10.1% to £3.4 billion. Tesco then planned to create 16,000 new jobs, 9,000 in the UK. In 2011 the retailer reported its poorest six-monthly UK sales figures for 20 years, attributed to consumers' reduced non-food spending and a growth in budget rivals.

By 2014, Tesco appeared to have lost some of its appeal to customers. The share price lost 49 per cent of its value up to October as it struggled to fend off competition from rivals Aldi and Lidl. In October 2014, Tesco suspended 8 executives following its announcement the previous month that it had previously overstated its profits by £250 million. The misreporting resulted in almost £2.2 billion being wiped off the value of the company's stock market value. The suspended executives included former commercial director Kevin Grace and UK managing director Chris Bush. The profit overstatement was subsequently revised upwards to £263 million following an investigation by the accountancy firm Deloitte, and it was clarified that the inflated profit figure was the result of Tesco bringing forward rebates from suppliers. The Serious Fraud Office (SFO) confirmed on 29 October 2014 that it was carrying out a criminal investigation into the accounting irregularities but declined to give further details. As a result, Tesco agreed to pay a fine and compensation. Three executives charged with fraud and false accounting in connection with the misreporting were cleared of the charges in 2018–2019.

=== Market share ===
According to Kantar Worldpanel, Tesco's share of the UK groceries market in the 12 weeks to 26 January 2025 was 28.5%, up from 27.8% in the 12 weeks to 28 January 2024.

Supermarket	Market share January 2025	+/- from January 2024
Tesco	28.5%	▲0.7%
Sainsbury's	15.9%	▲0.2%
Asda	12.6%	▼1.0%
Morrisons	8.6%	▼0.2%
Aldi	10.2%	▲0.1%
Lidl	7.2%	▲0.3%

In terms of the wider UK retail market, Tesco sales account for around one pound in every ten spent in British shops. In 2007 it was reported that its share was even larger, with one pound in every seven spent going to Tesco. In 2006, Inverness was branded as "Tescotown", because well over 50p in every £1 spent on food is believed to be spent in its three Tesco shops. By 2014 competition from other retailers led to a fall in Tesco's market share to 28.7%; this was the lowest level in a decade.

=== Corporate social responsibility ===
Tesco made a commitment to corporate social responsibility in the form of contributions of 1.87% in 2006 of its pre-tax profits to charities and local community organizations. This compares favourably with Marks & Spencer, whose 1.51% is lower than Sainsbury's 7.02%. This figure, £42 million is lower than the amount of money reported to have been avoided in tax during 2007 (see below). Will Hutton, in his role as chief executive of The Work Foundation, in 2007 praised Tesco for leading the debate on corporate responsibility. However Intelligent Giving has criticized the company for directing all "staff giving" support to the company's Charity of the Year.

In 1992, Tesco started a "computers for schools scheme", offering computers in return for vouchers given to Tesco customers and donated by them to schools and hospitals. Until 2004, £92 million of equipment went to these organizations. The scheme was also implemented in Poland.

In 2009, Tesco used the phrase, "Change for Good" as advertising, which is trademarked by Unicef for charity usage but not for commercial or retail use, which prompted the agency to say, "It is the first time in Unicef's history that a commercial entity has purposely set out to capitalize on one of our campaigns and subsequently damage an income stream which several of our programmes for children are dependent on." It went on to call on the public "...who have children's welfare at heart, to consider carefully who they support when making consumer choices."

Tesco's own-labels personal care and household products are stated to be cruelty-free, meaning that they are not tested on animals.

In June 2011, Tesco announced that it was working with 2degrees Network to create an online hub as part of its target to reduce its supply chain carbon footprint by 30% by 2020.

In September 2011, a Greenpeace report revealed that Tesco supermarkets in China were selling vegetables that contained pesticides at levels exceeding the legal limit, or were illegal. A green vegetable sample from Tesco turned up methamidophos and monocrotophos, the use of which has been prohibited in China since the beginning of 2007.

== Advertising ==
Prunella Scales, as Dotty Turnbull arguing about Tesco prices

A notable 1980s advert was "Checkout 82," which was made in 1982, where a till would have a receipt coming out of it with the prices on. This advert had synthpop music as the backing and people singing "Check it out, check it out".

Adverts in the early 1990s had a man called David, portrayed by Dudley Moore, on the hunt for free-range chickens from France and discovering many goods from around the world to purchase for Tesco. Late 2000s adverts included many celebrities and celebrity voice-overs such as The Spice Girls and the voice of actors James Nesbitt and Jane Horrocks.

Tesco's main advertising slogan is "Every little helps". Its advertisements in print and on television mainly consist of product shots (or an appropriate image, such as a car when advertising petrol) against a white background, with a price or appropriate text (e.g., "Tesco Value") superimposed on a red circle.

Tesco's in-shop magazine began in 2004, and is the largest-circulation magazine in the United Kingdom, with a circulation of 1.5 million as of 2024.

In November 2013, Tesco announced it would introduce face-scanning technology developed by Amscreen at all of its 450 UK petrol stations to target advertisements to individual customers.

== Criticism ==
Criticism of Tesco includes allegations of stifling competition due to its undeveloped "land bank", and breaching planning laws.

=== Slavery and forced labour ===
In 2014, The Guardian reported that Tesco purchased from Charoen Pokphand Foods, who were found to be using slave labour. Tesco condemned this and pledged to work with the supplier and other organisations to ensure the supply chain does not use slave labour.

In November 2020, a BBC investigation uncovered allegations of routine exploitation in southern Indian garment factories supplying several major British retailers, including Tesco. Female workers reported being forced to work overtime, suffering verbal abuse, and being denied basic amenities such as water or toilet breaks on shift. Tesco investigated the allegations and took steps to try and stop this exploitation.

In December 2022, an investigation by The Guardian revealed that Burmese migrant workers at the VK Garment Factory in Thailand, which produced F&F clothing for Tesco between 2017 and 2020, were subjected to forced labour conditions. Employees reported working up to 99 hours a week, receiving wages significantly below the Thai legal minimum, and having their immigration documents retained by the factory management.

In September 2025, an RTÉ investigation found that Tesco was selling products supplied by factories linked to a forced labour programme. Two Chinese companies, the Esquel Group and Jiangsu Lianfa Textiles, maintained operations in Xinjiang, a region producing up to 30% of the world’s cotton and home to the Uyghurs, a persecuted predominantly Muslim ethnic minority. While several clothing retailers, including Tesco, had vowed to cease sourcing from Xinjiang, the investigation tracked cotton from these suppliers through supply chains in Bangladesh and into products sold on Tesco shelves, which contravened the declarations that these suppliers had made to Tesco.

=== Litigation ===
Tesco has been criticised for aggressively pursuing critics of the company in Thailand. Writer and former MP Jit Siratranont faced up to two years in jail and a £16.4 million libel damages claim for saying that Tesco was expanding aggressively at the expense of small local retailers. Along with a business writer, they incorrectly over-stated the contribution that Tesco Lotus was making to global revenues. Tesco served them with writs in 2007 for criminal defamation and civil libel. The Thai court dismissed the case.

In August 2013, Tesco was fined £300,000 after admitting that it misled customers over the pricing of "half-price" strawberries.

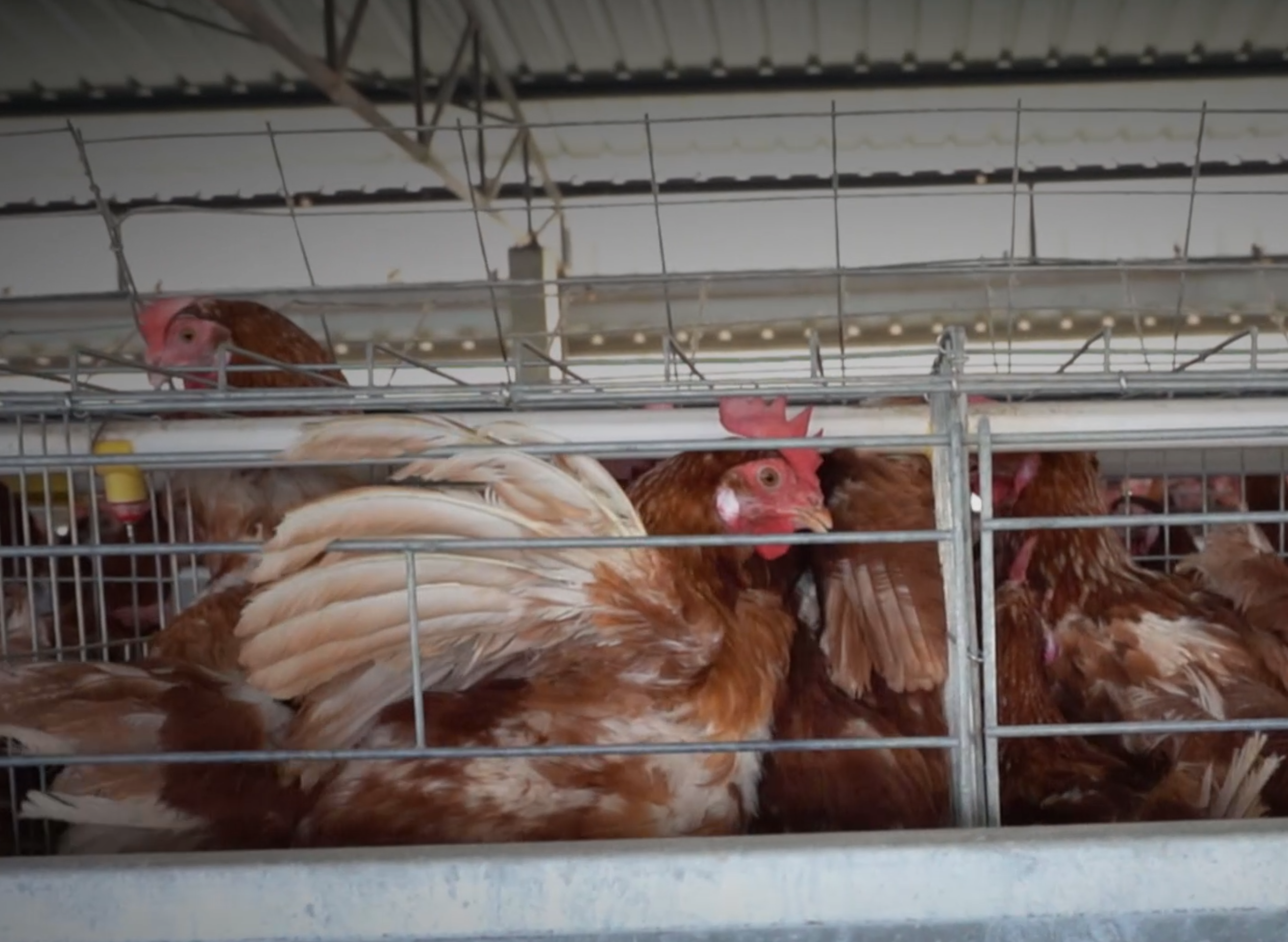
Tesco egg supplier in Thailand shown during an investigation that revealed hens in battery cages, unable to spread their wings

=== Animal welfare ===
Tesco has received criticism for supplying meat from intensive animal farms. In September 2019, footage from a farm supplying Tesco showed birds being kicked and hurled into crates. Tesco responded by suspending sales from the farm. The following year, an investigation into a chicken farm found fast-growing birds believed to be in chronic pain and others that could barely stand up.

In May 2021, undercover footage at a Tesco supplier showed piglets deemed too small or weak for the abattoir being hammered to death or swung against a concrete floor by farm workers. Tesco responded by ceasing to use the supplier. In July 2021, an investigation by a vegan charity showed chickens at a Tesco supplier being left to die of thirst in overcrowded sheds, with some resorting to cannibalism and many suffering ammonia burns. Tesco launched an investigation.

In 2024, Tesco faced a campaign led by the animal welfare organization Mercy for Animals urging the company to ban the practice of eyestalk ablation, in which the eyestalks of female shrimp are crushed or removed, as well as the use of ice slurry in its shrimp supply chain. Advocates claimed that ice slurry does not effectively render shrimp unconscious before slaughter. In August 2024, Tesco announced a new decapod crustacean welfare policy that bans eyestalk ablation and requires electrical stunning prior to slaughter for whiteleg shrimp starting in 2026 and bans eyestalk ablation for tiger prawns beginning in 2027.

=== Use of caged eggs ===
In 2016, following an online petition that called caging hens "cruel, unnatural, and inhumane", Tesco announced that it would begin selling only cage-free eggs in its UK locations by the end of 2025. At the time, 43% of Tesco eggs came from colony cage facilities.

In May 2019, an undercover investigation of a Tesco egg supplier in Asia found that Tesco was serving Southeast Asian customers eggs from battery cage farms. In August 2019, an investigation documented similar conditions at the company producing Tesco's own-brand eggs in Malaysia. In response to the investigation, Tesco committed to using only cage-free eggs in Thailand and Malaysia by 2028.

=== Price-fixing ===
In 2007, Tesco was placed under investigation by the UK Office of Fair Trading (OFT) for acting as part of a cartel of five supermarkets (Safeway, Tesco, Asda, Morrisons, and Sainsburys) and a number of dairy companies to fix the price of milk, butter, and cheese. In December 2007, Asda, Sainsbury's, and the former Safeway admitted that they acted covertly against the interests of consumers while publicly claiming that they were supporting 5,000 farmers recovering from the foot-and-mouth crisis. They were fined a total of £116 million.

=== Corporate tax structure ===
In May 2007, it was reported that Tesco had moved the head office of its online operations to Switzerland. This allows it to sell CDs, DVDs, and electronic games through its website without charging value-added tax (VAT). The operation had previously been run from Jersey but had been closed by authorities who feared damage to the island's reputation.

In June 2008, the government announced that it was closing a tax loophole being used by Tesco. The scheme, identified by British magazine Private Eye, utilized offshore holding companies in Luxembourg and partnership agreements to reduce corporation tax liability by up to £50 million a year. Another scheme previously identified by Private Eye involved depositing £1 billion in a Swiss partnership, and then loaning that money to overseas Tesco shops, so that profit could be transferred indirectly through interest payments. This scheme was still in operation in June 2008 and was estimated to be costing the UK exchequer up to £20 million a year in corporation tax. Tax expert Richard Murphy has provided an analysis of this avoidance structure.

Tax avoidance has not always been related to corporation tax. A number of companies including Tesco used a scheme to avoid VAT by deeming 2.5% of purchases paid for by card to be a 'card transaction fee', which reduced the company's tax liability without changing the charge to the customer. Such schemes came to light after HMRC litigated against Debenhams over the scheme in 2005.

=== Opposition to expansion ===
Tesco's expansion has been criticized, and in some cases actively opposed;

- Plans for a large Tesco shop in St Albans, Hertfordshire, attracted widespread local opposition. This led to the formation of the "Stop St Albans Tesco Group". In June 2008, St Albans Council refused planning permission for the proposed new shop.
- In April 2011, longstanding opposition to a Tesco Express shop in Cheltenham Road, Stokes Croft, Bristol, evolved into a violent clash between opponents and police. The recently opened shopfront was heavily damaged, and police reported the seizure of petrol bombs. Opponents have suggested that the shop would damage small shops and harm the character of the area.
- In March 2015 an arson attack gutted a new Tesco Express shop in Godalming, Surrey, two days before it was due to open. Tesco had purchased a public house and converted it into the new store, a change which did not require planning permission, thus denying the vigorous local opposition any formal means of preventing it. After continuing local opposition, including the local MP and borough council, Tesco abandoned its plans for the shop in January 2017.

=== Horse meat found in burgers ===
In January 2013, the British media reported that horse meat had been found in some meat products sold by Tesco, along with other retailers, particularly burgers. Prime Minister David Cameron called this "unacceptable", with products showing 29.1% horse meat in the "Value" range burger, which were supposed to be beef. It was later revealed in February 2013 that some of Tesco's Everyday Value Spaghetti Bolognese contained 60% horse meat. Tesco withdrew 26 of its products in response and announced that it was working with authorities and the supplier to investigate the cause of the contamination.

=== Guide dogs ===
Following a 2013 incident when the manager of Tesco in Sutton ordered a blind person and her guide dog to leave the shop, Tesco stated that its staff had received training to ensure that such an incident would not happen again. In 2014, Tesco staff shouted at a customer with a guide dog and told her not to return to the store. Tesco later said: "This clearly should never have happened and we will contact Ms Makri directly to apologise. We do allow guide dogs in stores and have reminded colleagues of that" and donated £5,000 to a guide dogs charity.

=== Israeli products and boycotts ===
In November 2025, Tesco faced protests and boycott calls from pro-Palestinian activists after suspending an employee at a store in Newcastle, County Down, Northern Ireland. The worker was placed on suspension pending disciplinary action after refusing to handle products imported from Israel. The Boycott, Divestment and Sanctions movement campaigned against the retailer, demanding the withdrawal of the disciplinary measures and arguing that workers should not be penalized for objecting to the sale of Israeli goods. Protesters gathered outside the branch with political groups and trade union representatives voicing solidarity with the employee, while online petitions gathered thousands of signatures demanding that Tesco cease stocking Israeli products.

=== Sale of antisemitic books ===
In 2005, Searchlight magazine said it was "horrified" to discover antisemitic books by US extremist publisher Liberty Bell on the Tesco website. Titles offered for sale included The Hitler We Loved and Why, The International Jew, and The Protocols of the Elders of Zion. Searchlight found another 106 titles by British-based publisher Steven Books which it describes as "so extreme that even the British National Party does not sell them". The shop said in a statement: "Tesco.com has over one million book titles covering a wide range of subjects. We are unhappy that titles which could cause offence to some customers have found their way on to our site and took immediate action to remove them once they were brought to our attention."

=== Suppliers ===
The UK Groceries Code Adjudicator found in a 2015–16 investigation into Tesco that some suppliers paid "large sums of money in exchange for category captaincy or participation in a price review". She found that Tesco had breached the code and was unreasonably delaying payments to suppliers and making unilateral deductions.

=== Amazon rainforest deforestation ===
In June 2021 there were protests outside Tesco Headquarters in Welwyn Garden City due to the involvement of Tesco in deforestation and forest fires in Brazil, as this is where Tesco sources the soy used to feed livestock for its meat produce.

=== Allegation of xenophobia ===
On 21 November 2020, a member of the Romanian diaspora in the United Kingdom said that in the Telford store there was a warning for shoplifters written in Romanian that said "notice for store thieves, you will be legally prosecuted if caught stealing". The Romanian Ministry of Foreign Affairs (MAE) expressed its "surprise and disagreement against the strongly discriminating message". The signs were produced by the West Mercia police.

=== Partnership with Usdaw ===
The relationship between the trade union Usdaw and Tesco management, has been met with criticism, with the union seemingly presenting itself as being concerned more with maintaining its positive, comfortable position and easy membership supply than that of fair representation of its members, earning the union the pejorative backronym of Useless Seven Days A Week amongst workers and trade unionists.

=== E.Coli allegation ===
In June 2024, a legal firm stated it had sent a letter of claim to Tesco, after a man contracted E.Coli and was hospitalised, claiming that this occurred as a result of eating a sandwich purchased from Tesco. The company stated they had not received the claim.

== Chairmen ==
- 1947–1970: Sir Jack Cohen
- 1970–1973: Hyman Kreitman
- 1973–1985: Sir Leslie Porter
- 1985–1997: Lord MacLaurin
- 1997–2004: John Gardiner
- 2004–2011: Sir David Reid
- 2011–2015: Richard Broadbent
- 2015–2023: John Allan
- September 2023–present: Gerry Murphy

== Arms ==
Coat of arms of Tesco
Adopted 1979 Crest A badger proper bearing a coin purse Gules stringed and tasselled Or, all set upon a wreath of the liveries. Escutcheon Argent, a pallet Gules between six cloves Sable, those in dexter bendways, and those in sinister bendwise sinister, all within a bordure of the Second. Supporters Two badgers Proper, gorged of collars wherefrom are pendent Crosses of Saint Anthony Or. Motto MERCATORES COENASCENT

== See also ==
- List of supermarket chains in the United Kingdom
- Tesco Town
- Tesco Venture Brands
- Value brands in the United Kingdom
