= Leslie Porter =

English businessman

Sir Leslie Porter (born Posament; 10 July 1920 – 20 March 2005) was an English businessman, chairman and managing director of Tesco Stores. Porter was managing director of J. Porter & Co (1955–59) before moving into management at Tesco. He was awarded an Honorary PhD in Business Management from Tel Aviv University in 1974.

== Early and private life ==
Porter was born in London, to Henry and Jane Posament. His first job, at age 14, was at HR Owen Rolls-Royce dealers, where he demonstrated his ability in sales. He joined the family owned textile business, J. Porter & Co., in 1938, after completing his schooling at Holloway County School.

During the Second World War, Porter served in the King's Royal Rifle Corps in Egypt, Greece, Crete, Libya, Tunisia, Algeria, and Italy, rising to the rank of Quartermaster sergeant, 1st Battalion in The Rangers. He re-joined the family business in 1946 and immediately reorganised the operations and structure of the company to include linens for the home and furnishing fabrics. By 1954 the business was making a profit and in 1955, Porter was appointed as managing director.

In 1948, Leslie Porter married Shirley Cohen (appointed DBE in 1991), daughter to Jack Cohen, founder of the Tesco supermarket chain. Jack, impressed with Leslie's success at J. Porter & Co. immediately offered him a job; however, independently wealthy and successful, Leslie did not make the move to Tesco Stores until 1959. Leslie and Shirley Porter had two children, John and Linda.

== Tesco ==
Porter joined Tesco Stores as a Director and Head of Home 'n' Wear department in 1959. His success in the developing non-foods divisions for Tesco led to his appointment as Assistant managing director in 1964. Porter and Cohen often clashed over business operations, and management styles; many of their boardroom clashes becoming anecdotal stories in the business world. Porter is credited with the successful restructuring Tesco, and implementing a sound business strategy which has ensured the continued success of the business.

Part of the success and expansion of Tesco Stores was the physical restructuring of stores; opening bigger stores in more significant locations, and essentially the creation of supermarkets in the United Kingdom. Under the leadership of Porter, Tesco expanded their range of services to customers and the group now operates in food, non-food retail, financial services, telecommunications and property development.

In 1977, Porter oversaw the decision to stop participation in the Green Shield Stamps program which had been running since the 1960s. The move enabled Tesco to save £20 million per year, which the company was able to use for grocery price reductions. Porter and the management team, launched Operation Checkout in 1977, aimed at passing on retails savings to clients.

In 1970, he was appointed as Deputy chairman. He was managing director between 1972 and 1973, and chairman from 1973 until 1985. Porter was President of Tesco Stores from 1985 until his retirement in 1990.

Leslie Porter was knighted in 1983, and appointed to the Order of St. James in 1992.

== Philanthropy ==
Sir Leslie retired with his wife Dame Shirley to Herzliya Pituah, Israel, in 1993 and was actively involved in philanthropic activities until his death in 2005. Their involvement included among others the Porter Foundation, and a number of charitable organisations in Israel and the United Kingdom.

In 1993, Sir Leslie Porter was appointed as Chancellor of Tel Aviv University. During his tenure, Porter and his wife set up several scholarship funds at the university, as well as working to expand the university premises by donating funds for the Shirley and Leslie Porter School of Cultural Studies, Porter Institute for Semiotics and Poetics, the Cohen-Porter United Kingdom Building of Life Sciences and the Cohen-Porter Family Swimming Pool.

Care for the elderly and services to benefit the elderly formed a large part of Porter's philanthropic activities in the United Kingdom, through the Porter Foundation and in Israel, with the funding of the Porter Senior Citizen Centre in Jaffa.

Sir Leslie Porter was a supporter of the arts, with his endowment of The Porter Gallery at Britain's National Portrait Gallery, and funding for The Porter Gallery at the V&A, as well as the Royal Academy.
