= Tesco Venture Brands =

Private / own label range

Tesco venture brands are an advanced form of private label brands launched by Tesco in 2011 that do not carry the retailer name. These products fall under the category of Tesco venture brands and complement their current value, standard and finest ranges. Tesco venture branded goods are available in a wide range of industries from food to children's toys to sanitary products. Most of the brands are positioned as "premium goods" competing with existing premium branded goods.

== The Difference Between Private Label Branding and Venture Branding ==
The concept of venture brands is a naming strategy that originates from private labels. Private labels are products or services that are manufactured or provided by one company for offer under another company's brand. Tesco venture brands are an evolution of this concept which attempts to disconnect the store name (Tesco) entirely from the product. Private label products are commonly associated with value for money however venture brands have been positioned as premium products, competing with existing premium named brands.

== Reasons for Launch of Venture Brands ==
=== Marketing Strategy ===
Modern consumers are increasingly willing to switch to substitutes or similar products due to the presence of easily accessible information. Creating new premium brands that do not carry the Tesco name (known for value products), this can be seen as an attempt by the retailer to attract more loyal customers as opposed to selling to customers who previously bought at Tesco due to price factors. Tesco Venture Brands such as Chokablok have been developed into premium products with unique branding and packaging, differing greatly from the conventional Tesco Value, Discount and Finest ranges. The effect of which can be seen as an effort to increase perceived value as packaging can contribute to the customer's understanding of the brand which can result in sales growth. The venture brands can be developed into a premium brand, which can result in added value for the product. The construction of premium brands can increase the extrinsic value of the product and increase perceived value by the customer.

=== Expansion of Business ===
Venture brands can also be seen as a strategy for business expansion. By creating a brand that is independent to the retailer, in terms of brand, can become a tool to target specific customer groups that do not favour the Tesco brand. This strategy may be explained by the various meat adulteration scandals associated with the Tesco brand. If the venture brands are successful and manage to attract a loyal customer base, this may give Tesco an advantage over competitors such as Waitrose and Sainsbury's. As the venture brands are managed by Tesco, the retailer will have the power to restrict sales of such venture branded products in Tesco stores.

=== Movement into Premium Market ===
From 2008 to 2014 Tesco has been extremely active in the sale of their premium range of products. Relaunched in 2013, Tesco Finest is the retailer's most premium range of private label products. From this it can be seen that Tesco has experienced success with this area of the market and according to Kantar Worldpanel, Tesco Finest range "is now the fastest growing premium brand in the market". It can be viewed that Tesco is attempting to break into the premium products market through the use of venture brands marketed as high quality brands that do not carry the retailer name. By creating venture brands, it can be seen that Tesco is attempting to appeal to customers who are deterred by unbranded products. Tesco stated in its 2012 annual report "to be a creator of highly valued brands".

== Advantages of Venture Brands ==
=== Diversification ===
In the view of consumers, venture brands have no relationship with the Tesco label. The venture brand will be independent to the retailer and the brand image of Tesco will not necessarily affect the brand image of the venture brand. This can be seen as a form of diversification. If the retailer's brand image suffers, the venture brand image should not be affected.

=== Changing Customer Preferences ===
Venture brands can be an opportunity for Tesco to experiment with new products for consumers. The retailer will have the ability to make adjustments to changing customer preferences. The ability to implement these changes quickly can result in greater market share for the venture branded goods and the retailer.

== Venture Brands ==
Chokablok: A premium ice cream and chocolate range launched in 2011. The ice cream range was delisted on 1 October 2014 but confectionery products have remained in production. Chokablok ice cream was arguably the most successful venture brand with the tub version of the brand worth sales of £1.5m. Chokablok was also the first venture brand to be sold outside of Tesco's existing retail chain, the premium chocolate range was first sold in mid 2012 at various zoos, theme parks and piers across the UK.

Parioli: A range of Italian dining products including pasta, cooking sauces, olive oil and tinned tomatoes. Parioli, alongside Chokablok is widely regarded as one of the few successful venture brands launched by Tesco. With MNDB (advertising firm) claiming Parioli to be "Tesco's most successful venture brand".

== Criticism ==
Since the inception, Tesco's venture brands have experienced varied success. With the Chokablok and Parioli brands seen as the only brands that have shown success. There has been criticism by members in the marketing industry claiming some of the brands "are simply named products and have not been cared for and marked as brands in the way that real brands would be".

Many of the venture brands first launched in 2011 have subsequently become delisted including New York Soup Co., Yoo Yoghurt, Lathams, Nutricat and Halo. Tesco has also been criticised for reverting to placing the Tesco logo back onto such venture brands.
