= Jack's (store) =

2018–2022 British discount supermarket chain

- Type: Private
- Industry: Retail
- Founded: 2018; 8 years ago
- Defunct: 25 March 2022; 4 years ago
- Headquarters: Tesco House, Welwyn Garden City, Hertfordshire, United Kingdom
- Number of locations: 14
- Area served: United Kingdom
- Key people: Dave Lewis (CEO); Lawrence Harvey (MD)
- Owner: Tesco plc
- Website: Website archive

Jack's was a British discount supermarket chain based in Welwyn Garden City, Hertfordshire, owned by Tesco.

== History ==
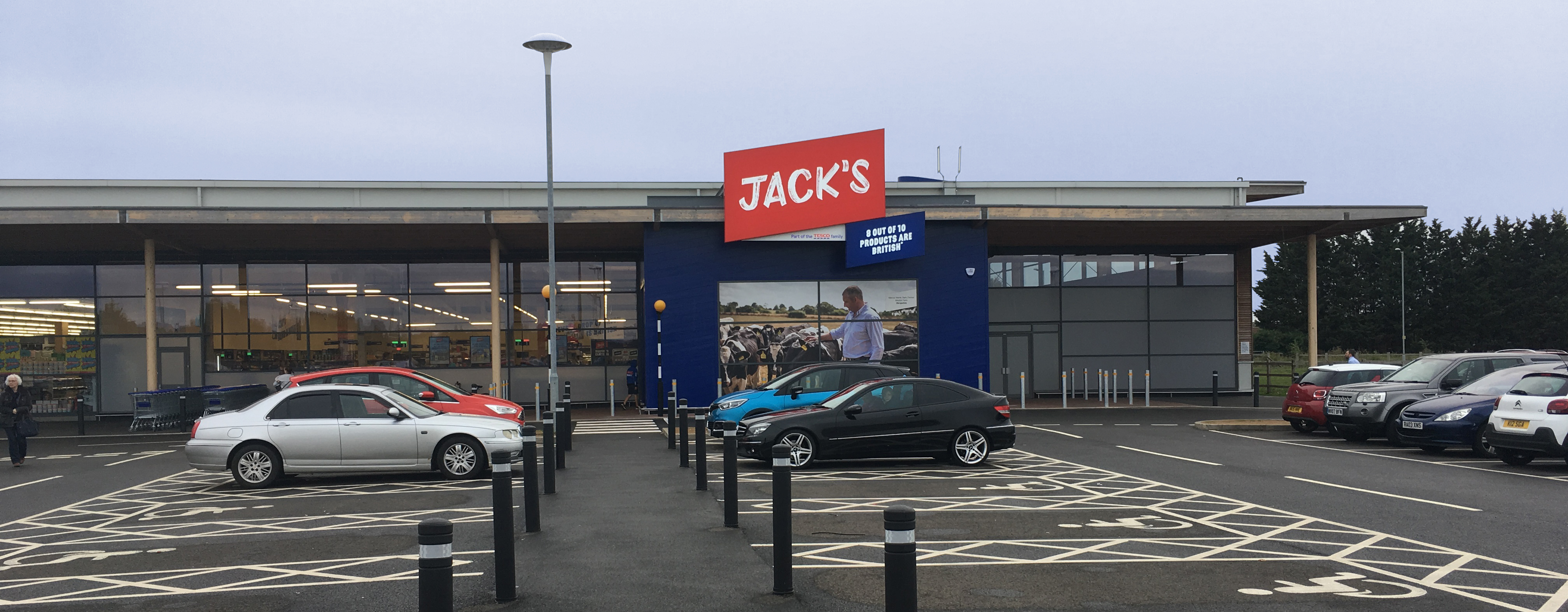
Exterior of Jack's supermarket in Chatteris, Cambridgeshire, the first store using this brand to open in September 2018.

Named after Tesco founder Jack Cohen, Jack's was established in 2018 to compete with less expensive supermarkets like Lidl and Aldi. The first stores were opened in Chatteris and Immingham on 20 September 2018. Initial plans were to open between ten and fifteen stores within six months of launching; ultimately, only fourteen stores were opened across the UK.

From May 2019, selected products from Jack's stores were made available in those of Tesco.

Following what it claimed was research and the solicitation of customer feedback, in September 2019, Tesco announced that the store in Rawtenstall would be reverted to a Tesco. In January 2022, it was announced that Jack's as a whole would be wound down, with six stores becoming Tescos and the remaining seven closing. The first stores were closed on 7 March, and the final stores closed on 25 March. The brand lives on through products distributed to other supermarkets by Tesco subsidiary Booker Group.

== Stores ==
Store	Address	Opened	Closed	Status
Chatteris (Cambridgeshire)	Jacks, Fenland Way, Chatteris, Cambridgeshire, PE16 6RT	Thu 20th Sep 2018	Sun 06th Mar 2022	Reopened as a Tesco Superstore branch.
Immingham (Lincolnshire)	Jacks, Kennedy Way, Washdyke Lane, Immingham, Lincolnshire, DN40 2AB	Thu 20th Sep 2018	Sun 13th Mar 2022	Reopened as a Tesco Superstore branch.
Hull (East Yorkshire)	Jacks, Unit 4B, Kingston Retail Park, Kingston Street, Hull, East Yorkshire, HU1 2TX	Thu 15th Jul 2021	Thu 24th Mar 2022	Store closed and building sold.
Wakefield (West Yorkshire)	Jacks, Unit 1B, Westgate Retail Park, Ings Road, Wakefield, West Yorkshire, WF2 9SD	Thu 14th Nov 2019	Thu 20th Mar 2022	Reopened as a Tesco Superstore branch, however, it permanently closed on 15 September 2023.
Barnsley (South Yorkshire)	Jacks, Wombwell Lane, Barnsley, South Yorkshire, S70 3NS	Mon 10th Dec 2018	Thu 24th Mar 2022	Store closed and building sold.
Sheffield (South Yorkshire)	Jacks, Unit 8, Kilner Way Retail Park, Halifax Road, Sheffield, South Yorkshire, S6 1NN	Thu 28th Nov 2019	Sun 06th Mar 2022	Reopened as a Tesco Superstore branch, however, it permanently closed on 15 September 2023.
Castle Bromwich (Birmingham)	Jacks, 2, Timberley Lane, Castle Bromwich, West Midlands, B34 7EH	Thu 01st Nov 2018	Thu 24th Mar 2022	Store closed and building sold.
Rubery (Birmingham)	Jacks, New Road, Rubery, West Midlands, B45 9JL	Thu 18th Oct 2018	Sun 20th Mar 2022	Reopened as a Tesco Superstore branch.
Croxteth (Liverpool)	Jacks, Unit 3, Liverpool Retail Park, Axis Park, Portal Way, East Lancashire Road, Croxteth, Merseyside, L11 0JA	Thu 21st Nov 2019	Thu 24th Mar 2022	Store closed and building sold.
Edge Hill (Liverpool)	Jacks, Overton Street, Edge Hill, Merseyside, L7 3HE	Thu 04th Oct 2018	Sun 13th Mar 2022	Reopened as a Tesco Superstore branch.
Saint Helens (Liverpool)	Jacks, The Shopping Centre, Four Acre Lane, Clock Face, Saint Helens, Merseyside, WA9 4BZ	Thu 04th Oct 2018	Thu 24th Mar 2022	Store closed and building sold.
Walton (Liverpool)	Jacks, 124, County Road, Lowell Street, Walton, Merseyside, L4 3QW	Thu 08th Aug 2019	Thu 24th Mar 2022	Store closed and building sold.
Middlewich (Cheshire)	Jacks, Off Wheelock Street, Middlewich, Cheshire, CW10 9BL	Thu 18th Oct 2018	Thu 24th Mar 2022	Store closed and building sold.
Rawtenstall (Lancashire)	Jacks, Bocholt Way, Rawtenstall, Lancashire, BB4 6DB	Wed 03rd Apr 2019	Sun 20th Oct 2019	Reopened as a Tesco Superstore branch.
