= Catteau =

Catteau is a surname. Notable people with the surname include:

- Aloïs Catteau (1877–1939), Belgian road racing cyclist
- Charles Catteau (1880–1966), French Art Déco industrial designer
- Robert Catteau, namesake of the Athénée Robert Catteau
