= Express pricing =

Form of price discrimination

Express pricing is a form of price discrimination where, in a reverse of economies of scale, retailers raise their prices slightly in smaller stores. The name of the practice originates from Tesco's Tesco Express stores in the UK, but the term can be used to apply to any retailer operating a similar policy. A 2018 Inside Out investigation, which looked at practices within Tesco, Sainsbury's, Marks and Spencer, and Waitrose, found that some smaller store prices were 178% more than prices in their larger-format counterparts. According to Sainsbury's, this can be attributed to discrepancies in "operational requirements and running costs. Rents, for example." The store stated that it can be "more of a challenge to deliver products to our local stores", and referred also to "other factors such as staffing, local rates and a focus on convenience products".

Tesco themselves have acknowledged this, saying "Our prices don’t differ greatly but they will differ slightly because of the difference in costs of running the smaller stores. Express stores are typically on the high street, which means Tesco don't very often own the land. So the overheads involved in running a smaller store are higher."

In 2011, Marks and Spencer's policy of charging express pricing in their Simply Food branches was reported on. A spokesperson has admitted "prices are a little higher than at our high street stores".

Aldi Local charged express pricing as soon as they opened.

Express pricing attracted particular opprobrium in 2021 after Tesco rebranded 89 of its Metro stores into Express stores; with their Express branches not taking part in Tesco's "Aldi Price Match" scheme, many shoppers reported overnight price increases of up to 50% on some lines. In 2022, News Shopper reported that there were differences in prices between Asda's Bexleyheath Graham Road superstore and their Crook Log supermarket.
