= Charles Catteau =

French Art Deco industrial designer

- Born: 26 January 1880; Douai, France
- Died: 20 October 1966 (aged 86); Nice, France
- Education: Alexandre Sandier; Théodore Deck
- Known for: Ceramics
- Movement: Art Déco
- Awards: Gold medal of the Exhibition of Decorative and Industrial Arts (Paris, 1925)

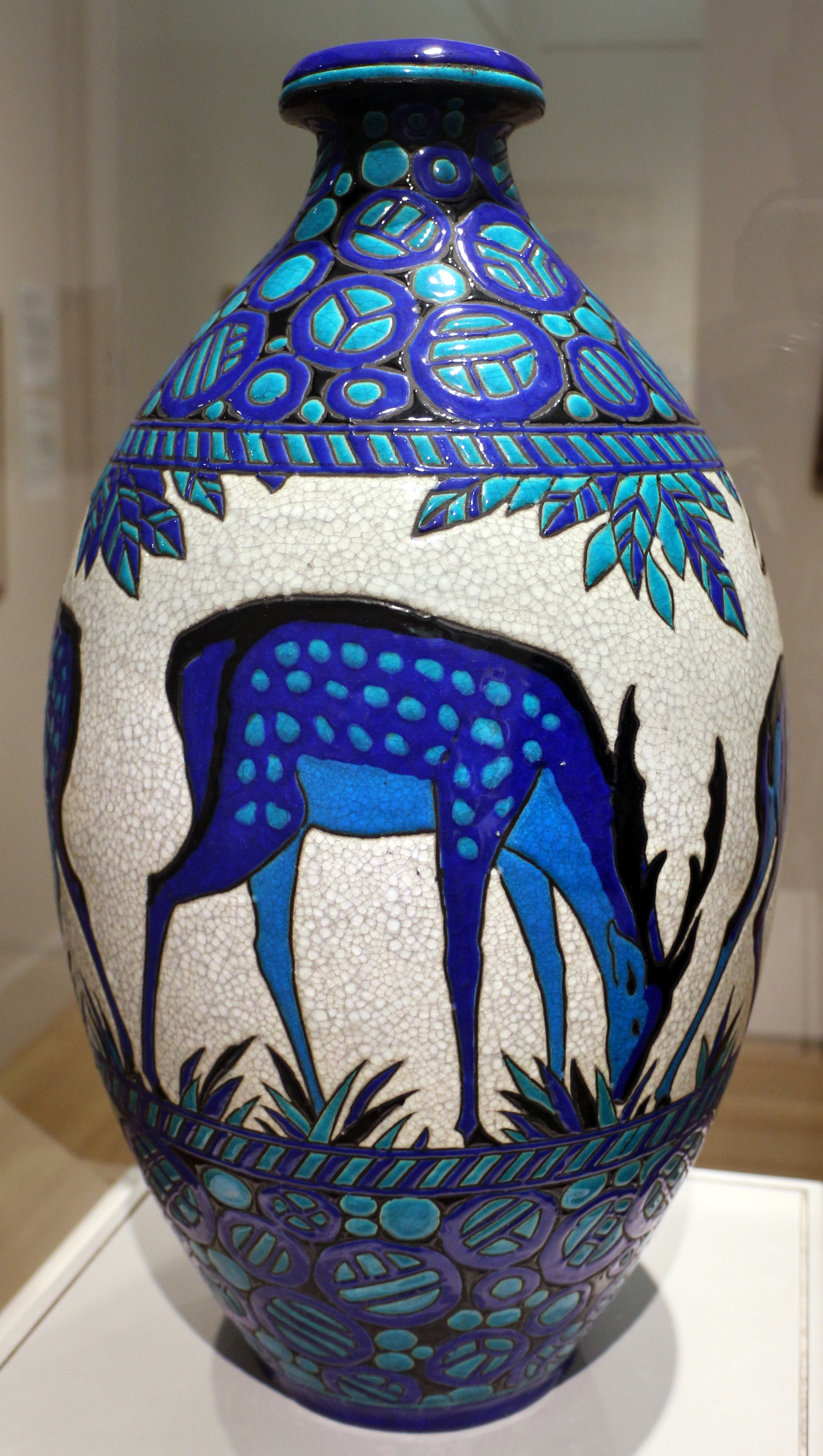
Vase for Boch Frères, c. 1924

Charles Catteau (26 January 1880, Douai – 20 October 1966, Nice) was a French Art Deco industrial designer.

== Biography ==
Born at Douai, Charles Catteau trained at the National Ceramics School in Sèvres and followed a training course at the National Porcelain Factory in the same town. In 1904, Catteau was hired by the German Nymphenburg Porcelain Factory, near Munich.

In December 1906, he moved to La Louvière with his small family and started to work for Boch Frères Keramis, a Belgian earthenware factory located in La Louvière since the 19th century. It is unclear whether Anna Boch introduced Catteau into the La Louvière factory. The two artists had known each other since Munich. Catteau immediately became a member of Anna Boch's "Kring Der Vrienden Der Schone Kunsten" (= Circle of Friends of The Fine Arts).

In 1907, he was appointed head of the Decoration Department and Workshop of Imaginative Design, where he remained until 1948. He died at Nice in 1966.

Charles Catteau gathered a group of artists around him, what resulted in an incredible wide variety of designs. He experimented with shapes, material, glazes and textures.

Between 1920 and 1940, hundreds of designs were created, and some were produced during many years. Unfortunately, a lot of badly produced pieces left the factory; so, the general perception of a high-quality product lost some of its glamour.

At the end, the top pieces made by Catteau often were produced in restricted quantity and were hotly sought after. Many of these pieces ended up in collections in France and the US and in Belgium where they were produced.

== Sources ==
- Draguet, Michel, ed. (2001). Catteau – Donation Claire De Pauw et Marcel Stal. Bruxelles: King Baudouin Foundation. ISBN 2-87212-357-1.
- Corrieras, Dominique (1991). L'homme de Kéramis – Charles Catteau (in French). Paris: Vivre son Temps. ISBN 2-9505973-0-0.
- Pairon, Marc (2006). Art Deco Ceramics Made in Belgium. Charles Catteau. Fondation Charles Catteau. ISBN 90-810243-1-0.
