= Edgar Pearce =

British extortionist

Edgar Eugene Pearce (born 1937 or 38) is a British extortionist and bomber who was convicted of the Mardi Gra bombings, a three-year blackmail and terror campaign in the London area between December 1994 and April 1998.

== Early life ==
Pearce grew up in Leyton, east London. At the age of 11, he went to Nelson House preparatory school in Oxford. His parents were unable to pay the fees, and three years later he came back to the family home and attended Norlington Boys' School in Leyton. Pearce attended there for two years before leaving, at age 16, to go into the advertising industry.

== Mardi Gra bombings ==
After a dispute with Barclays Bank, Pearce targeted six different branches on 6 December 1994 with home-made bombs. Two of them, in Hampstead and Ladbroke Grove, exploded, injuring two members of staff. From May 1995, Pearce was randomly sending bombs to different targets and addresses, including one to the Barclaycard headquarters in Northampton with a blackmail demand. In 1996 he targeted Barclays banks again, exploding two devices in the Ealing branch and one in Eltham from January to April. Three civilian injuries were caused by the last one in Ealing on 20 April.

After 17 months of inactivity, Pearce resumed his blackmailing and bombing campaign, this time targeting Sainsbury's supermarkets, in the hope of obtaining money from them. He targeted five branches in November 1997 in the west and south-east London. A 73-year-old woman accidentally picked up a device left in West Ealing with her shopping. His last attack was in Eltham, south-east London, on 17 April 1998.

In total, he planted 36 devices. At the time he was unemployed and divorced, living in the affluent Chiswick area of west London. Police believed the suspect was acting alone and possibly influenced by Ted Kaczynski, who was being sentenced in America at the time.

On 28 April 1998, Pearce was arrested in Whitton, south-west London, after falling into a police trap whilst withdrawing cash, as his account was linked and being watched by the police. At his Chiswick home, police found home-made bombs. His terror campaign cost Sainsbury's £640,000 in lost trade.

Lawyers acting for Pearce claimed he suffers from Binswanger's disease, a rare form of dementia that can change the way people think. But following further medical reports, the judges at the Old Bailey rejected this. On 14 April 1999, he was convicted of 20 charges including causing an explosion, possessing firearms and wounding, and was sentenced to a total of 224 years, most to be served concurrently, resulting in 21 years of imprisonment.

Pearce was labelled the Mardi Gra bomber because he often left a calling card containing the phrase "Welcome to the Mardi Gra experience".

== See also ==
- Tesco blackmail plot - an extortion attempt against Tesco and which led to the largest blackmail investigation in the UK, between 2018 and 2020, where an extortionist threatened to contaminate baby food with salmonella, white powder and knives
- 2007 Tesco blackmail campaign - an extortion attempt against the British supermarket chain Tesco in 2007, where an extortionist threatened to put caustic soda in yoghurt sold in the store
- Tesco bomb campaign - an attempted extortion against British supermarket chain Tesco in August 2000, in which a blackmailer identified by the pseudonym "Sally" sent letters to Tesco stores threatening to harm customers if his demands—for Clubcards, modified so that the holder could withdraw cash from ATMs—were not met. Several months after the threat first came to light, "Sally" sent out several letter bombs.
- Pedigree Chum dog food and Heinz extortion campaign - an extortion against Pedigree Petfoods and Heinz by Rodney Whitchelo, who contaminated dog and baby food.
