= Sabotage =

Deliberate action aimed at weakening another entity

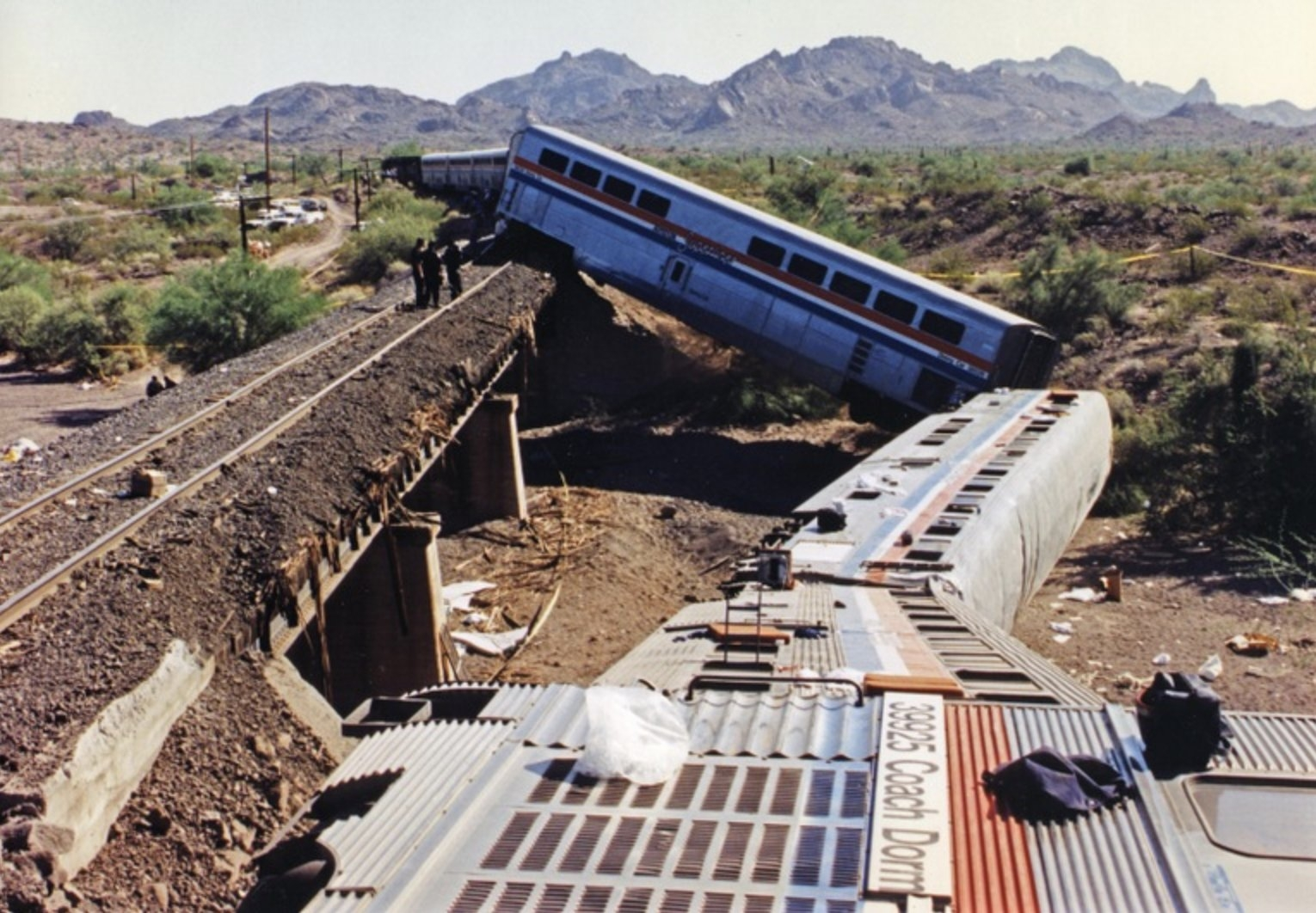
Aftermath of the 1995 Palo Verde, Arizona, derailment, an act of sabotage.

Sabotage is a deliberate action aimed at weakening a polity, government, effort, or organization through subversion, obstruction, demoralization, destabilization, division, disruption, or destruction. One who engages in sabotage is a saboteur. Saboteurs typically try to conceal their identities because of the consequences of their actions and to avoid invoking legal and organizational requirements for addressing sabotage.

== Etymology ==
The English word derives from the French word saboter, meaning to "bungle, botch, wreck or sabotage"; it was originally used to refer to labour disputes, in which workers wearing wooden shoes called sabots interrupted production through different means. A popular but incorrect account of the origin of the term's present meaning is the story that poor workers in the Belgian city of Liège would throw a wooden sabot into the machines to disrupt production.

One of the first appearances of saboter and saboteur in French literature is in the Dictionnaire du Bas-Langage ou manières de parler usitées parmi le peuple of d'Hautel, edited in 1808. In it the literal definition is to 'make noise with sabots' as well as 'bungle, jostle, hustle, haste'. The word sabotage appears only later.

The word sabotage is found in 1873–1874 in the Dictionnaire de la langue française of Émile Littré. Here it is defined mainly as 'making sabots, sabot maker'. It is at the end of the 19th century that it really began to be used with the meaning of 'deliberately and maliciously destroying property' or 'working slower'. In 1897, Émile Pouget, a famous syndicalist and anarchist wrote "action de saboter un travail" ('action of sabotaging or bungling a work') in Le Père Peinard and in 1911 he also wrote a book entitled Le Sabotage.

== As industrial action ==
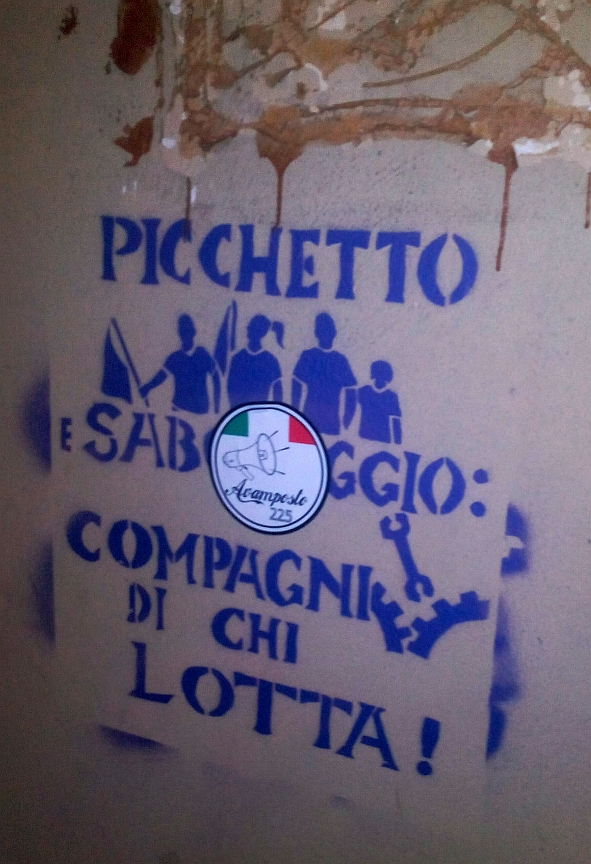
Unauthorized stencil urging sabotage and picketing

At the inception of the Industrial Revolution, skilled workers such as the Luddites (1811–1812) used sabotage as a means of negotiation in labor disputes.

Labor unions such as the Industrial Workers of the World (IWW) have advocated sabotage as a means of self-defense and direct action against unfair working conditions.

The IWW was shaped in part by the industrial unionism philosophy of Big Bill Haywood, and in 1910 Haywood was exposed to sabotage while touring Europe:

The experience that had the most lasting impact on Haywood was witnessing a general strike on the French railroads. Tired of waiting for parliament to act on their demands, railroad workers walked off their jobs all across the country. The French government responded by drafting the strikers into the army and then ordering them back to work. Undaunted, the workers carried their strike to the job. Suddenly, they could not seem to do anything right. Perishables sat for weeks, sidetracked and forgotten. Freight bound for Paris was misdirected to Lyon or Marseille instead. This tactic – the French called it "sabotage" – won the strikers their demands and impressed Bill Haywood.

For the IWW, sabotage's meaning expanded to include the original use of the term: any withdrawal of efficiency, including the slowdown, the strike, working to rule, or creative bungling of job assignments.

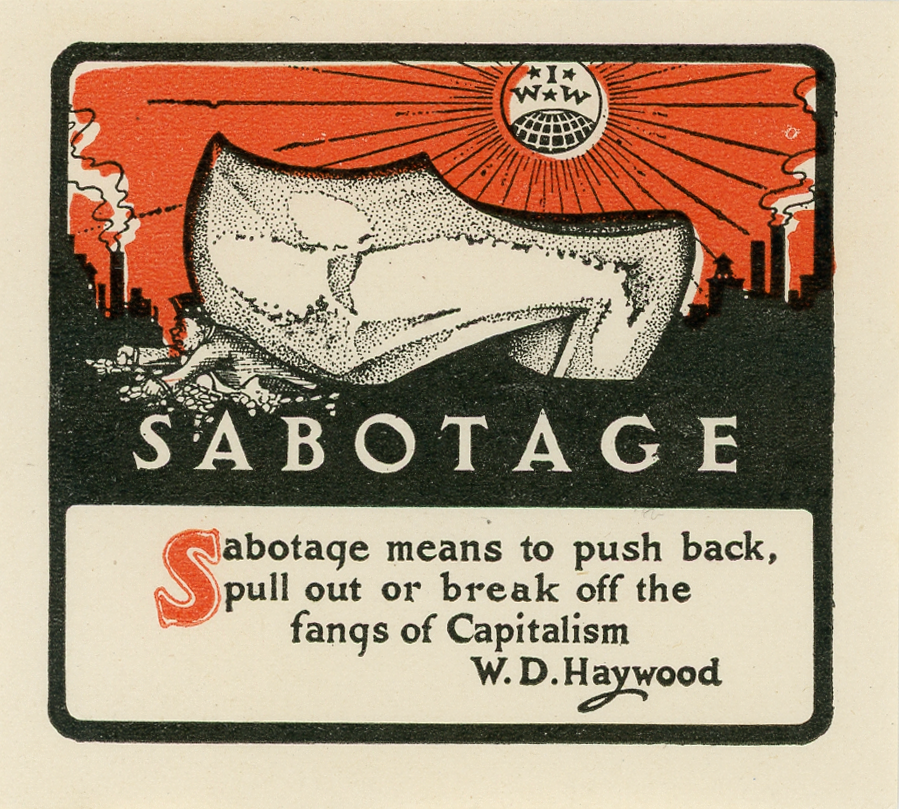
Industrial Workers of the World "stickerette" or "silent agitator"

One of the most severe examples was at the construction site of the Robert-Bourassa Generating Station in 1974, in Québec, Canada, when workers used bulldozers to topple electric generators, damaged fuel tanks, and set buildings on fire. The project was delayed a year, and the direct cost of the damage estimated at $2 million CAD. The causes were not clear, but three possible factors have been cited: inter-union rivalry, poor working conditions, and the perceived arrogance of American executives of the contractor, Bechtel Corporation.

== As environmental action ==
Certain groups turn to the destruction of property to stop or protest environmental harm.

From 1992 to late 2007 a radical environmental activist movement known as Earth Liberation Front (ELF) engaged in a near-constant campaign of decentralized sabotage of any construction projects near wildlands and extractive industries such as logging and even an arson attack against a ski resort in Vail, Colorado. ELF used sabotage tactics often in loose coordination with other environmental activist movements to physically delay or destroy threats to wildlands as the political will developed to protect the targeted wild areas that ELF engaged.

== As war tactic ==
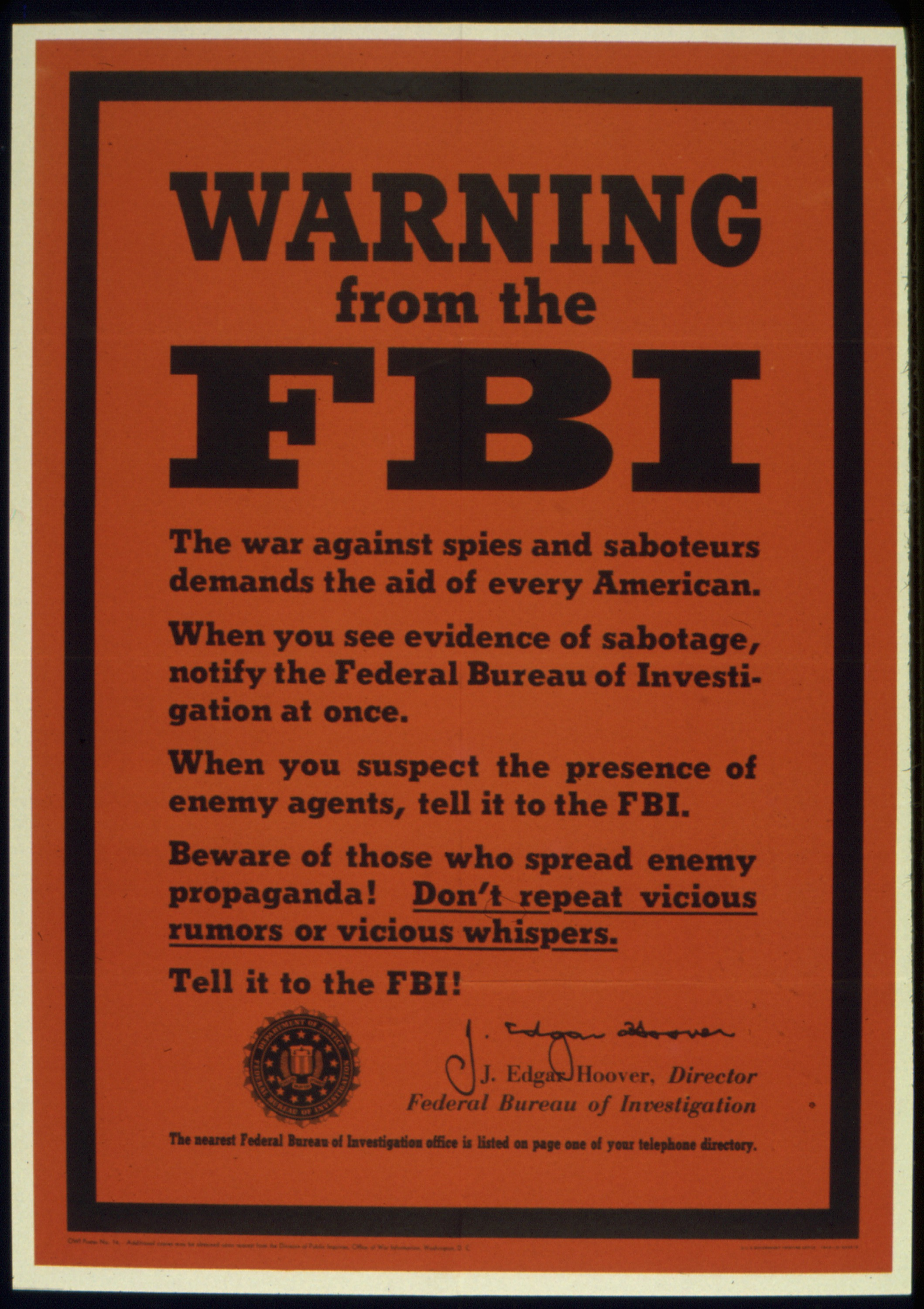
World War II poster from the United States

In war, the word is used to describe the activity of an individual or group not associated with the military of the parties at war, such as a foreign agent or an indigenous supporter, in particular when actions result in the destruction or damaging of a productive or vital facility, such as equipment, factories, dams, public services, storage plants or logistic routes. Prime examples of such sabotage are the events of Black Tom and the Kingsland explosion. Like spies, saboteurs who conduct a military operation in civilian clothes or enemy uniforms behind enemy lines are subject to prosecution and criminal penalties instead of detention as prisoners of war. It is common for a government in power during war or supporters of the war policy to use the term loosely against opponents of the war. Similarly, German nationalists spoke of a stab in the back having cost them the loss of World War I.

A modern form of sabotage is the distribution of software intended to damage specific industrial systems. For example, the U.S. Central Intelligence Agency (CIA) is alleged to have sabotaged a Siberian pipeline during the Cold War, using information from the Farewell Dossier. (Note: These allegations are contained in the 2004 book At the Abyss: An Insider's History of the Cold War. Critics have contested the authenticity of the account.) A more recent case may be the Stuxnet computer worm, which was designed to subtly infect and damage specific types of industrial equipment. Based on the equipment targeted and the location of infected machines, security experts believe it was an attack on the Iranian nuclear program by the United States or Israel.

Sabotage, done well, is inherently difficult to detect and difficult to trace to its origin. During World War II, the U.S. Federal Bureau of Investigation (FBI) investigated 19,649 cases of sabotage and concluded the enemy had not caused any of them.

Sabotage in warfare, according to the Office of Strategic Services (OSS) Simple Sabotage Field Manual, varies from highly technical coup de main acts that require detailed planning and specially trained operatives, to innumerable simple acts that ordinary citizen-saboteurs can perform. Simple sabotage is carried out in such a way as to involve a minimum danger of injury, detection, and reprisal. There are two main methods of sabotage: physical destruction and the "human element". While physical destruction as a method is self-explanatory, its targets are nuanced, reflecting objects to which the saboteur has normal and inconspicuous access in everyday life. The "human element" is based on universal opportunities to make faulty decisions, to adopt a non-cooperative attitude, and to induce others to follow suit.

There are many examples of physical sabotage in wartime. However, one of the most effective uses of sabotage is against organizations. The OSS manual provides numerous techniques under the title "General Interference with Organizations and Production":

- When possible, refer all matters to committees for "further study and consideration". Attempt to make the committees as large as possible—never fewer than five
- Bring up irrelevant issues as frequently as possible.
- Haggle over precise wordings of communications, minutes, resolutions.
- In making work assignments, always sign out unimportant jobs first, assign important jobs to inefficient workers with poor machines.
- Insist on perfect work in relatively unimportant products; send back for refinishing those with the least flaw. Approve other defective parts whose flaws are not visible to the naked eye.
- To lower morale, and with it, production, be pleasant to inefficient workers; give them undeserved promotions. Discriminate against efficient workers; complain unjustly about their work.
- Hold meetings when there is more critical work to be done.
- Multiply procedures and clearances involved in issuing instructions, paychecks, and so on. See that multiple people must approve everything where one would do.
- Spread disturbing rumors that sound like inside information.

From the section entitled, "General Devices for Lowering Morale and Creating Confusion" comes the following quintessential simple sabotage advice: "Act stupid."

=== Value of simple sabotage in wartime ===
The United States Office of Strategic Services, later renamed the CIA, noted the specific value in committing simple sabotage against the enemy during wartime: "... slashing tires, draining fuel tanks, starting fires, starting arguments, acting stupidly, short-circuiting electric systems, abrading machine parts will waste materials, manpower, and time." To underline the importance of simple sabotage on a widespread scale, they wrote, "Widespread practice of simple sabotage will harass and demoralize enemy administrators and police." The OSS was also focused on the battle for hearts and minds during wartime; "the very practice of simple sabotage by natives in enemy or occupied territory may make these individuals identify themselves actively with the United Nations War effort, and encourage them to assist openly in periods of Allied invasion and occupation."

=== In World War I ===
On 30 July 1916, the Black Tom explosion occurred when German agents set fire to a complex of warehouses and ships in Jersey City, New Jersey that held munitions, fuel, and explosives bound to aid the Allies in their fight.

On 11 January 1917, Fiodore Wozniak, using a rag saturated with phosphorus or an incendiary pencil supplied by German sabotage agents, set fire to his workbench at an ammunition assembly plant near Lyndhurst, New Jersey, causing a four-hour fire that destroyed half a million 3-inch explosive shells and destroyed the plant for an estimated at $17 million in damages. Wozniak's involvement was not discovered until 1927.

On 12 February 1917, Bedouins allied with the British destroyed a Turkish railroad near the port of Wajh, derailing a Turkish locomotive. The Bedouins traveled by camel and used explosives to demolish a portion of track.

=== Post World War I ===
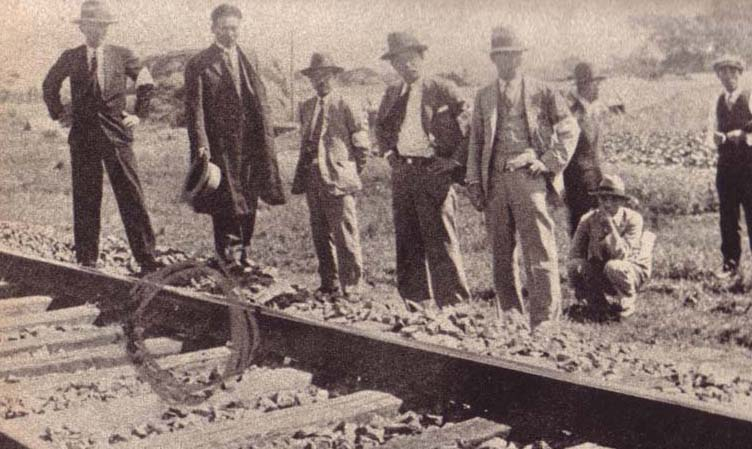
Japanese experts inspect the scene of the "railway sabotage" on the South Manchurian Railway in 1931. The "railroad sabotage" was one of the events that led to the Mukden Incident and the Japanese occupation of Manchuria.

In Ireland, the Irish Republican Army (IRA) used sabotage against the British following the Easter 1916 uprising. The IRA compromised communication lines and lines of transportation and fuel supplies. The IRA also employed passive sabotage, with dock and railroad workers refusing to work on ships and rail cars used by the government. In 1920, agents of the IRA committed arson against at least fifteen British warehouses in Liverpool. The following year, the IRA set fire to numerous British targets again, including the Dublin Customs House, this time sabotaging most of Liverpool's firetrucks in the firehouses before lighting the matches.

=== In World War II ===
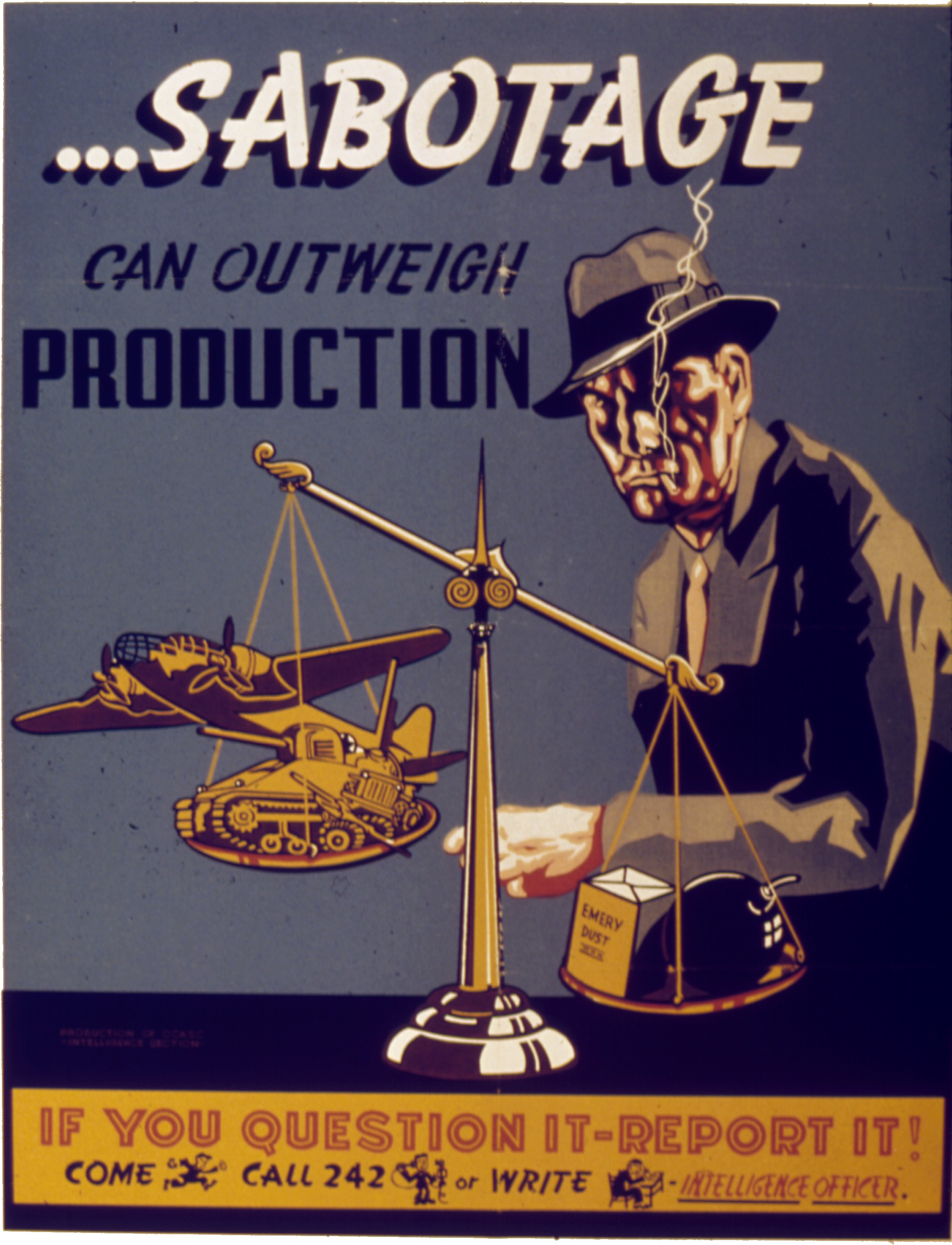
United States World War II-era poster warning against sabotage

Lieutenant Colonel George T. Rheam was a British soldier, who ran Brickendonbury Manor from October 1941 to June 1945 during World War II, which was Station XVII of the Special Operations Executive (SOE), which trained specialists for the SOE. Rheam innovated many sabotage techniques and is considered by M. R. D. Foot the "founder of modern industrial sabotage."

A film from Camp Claiborne from March 8, 9 and 10 1944 of derailment tests done on the Claiborne-Polk Military Railroad. The tests were done to better train allied personnel in acts of rail sabotage during World War 2.

Sabotage training for the Allies consisted of teaching would-be saboteurs' key components of working machinery to destroy. "Saboteurs learned hundreds of small tricks to cause the Germans big trouble. The cables in a telephone junction box ... could be jumbled to make the wrong connections when numbers were dialed. A few ounces of plastique, properly placed, could bring down a bridge, cave in a mine shaft, or collapse the roof of a railroad tunnel."

The Polish Home Army Armia Krajowa, which commanded the majority of resistance organizations in Poland (even the National Forces, except the Military Organization Lizard Union; the Home Army also included the Polish Socialist Party – Freedom, Equality, Independence) and coordinated and aided the Jewish Military Union as well as more reluctantly helping the Jewish Combat Organization, was responsible for the greatest number of acts of sabotage in German-occupied Europe. The Home Army's sabotage operations Operation Garland and Operation Ribbon are just two examples. In all, the Home Army damaged 6,930 locomotives, set 443 rail transports on fire, damaged over 19,000 rail cars, and blew up 38 rail bridges, not to mention the attacks against the railroads. The Home Army was also responsible for 4,710 built-in flaws in parts for aircraft engines and 92,000 built-in flaws in artillery projectiles, among other examples of significant sabotage. In addition, over 25,000 acts of more minor sabotage were committed. It continued to fight against both the Germans and the Soviets; however, it did aid the Western Allies by collecting constant and detailed information on the German rail, wheeled, and horse transports. As for Stalin's proxies, their actions led to a great number of the Polish and Jewish hostages, mostly civilians, being murdered in reprisal by the Germans. The Gwardia Ludowa destroyed around 200 German trains during the war, and indiscriminately threw hand grenades into places frequented by Germans.

The French Resistance ran an extremely effective sabotage campaign against the Germans during World War II. Receiving their sabotage orders through messages over the BBC radio or by aircraft, the French used both passive and active forms of sabotage. Passive forms included losing German shipments and allowing poor quality material to pass factory inspections. Many active sabotage attempts were against critical rail lines of transportation. German records count 1,429 instances of sabotage from French Resistance forces between January 1942 and February 1943. From January through March 1944, sabotage accounted for three times the number of locomotives damaged by Allied air power. See also Normandy landings for more information about sabotage on D-Day.

During World War II, the Allies committed sabotage against the Peugeot truck factory. After repeated failures in Allied bombing attempts to hit the factory, a team of French Resistance fighters and Special Operations Executive (SOE) agents distracted the German guards with a game of soccer while part of their team entered the plant and destroyed machinery.

In December 1944, the Germans ran a false flag sabotage infiltration, Operation Greif, which was commanded by Waffen-SS commando Otto Skorzeny during the Battle of the Bulge. German commandos, wearing US Army uniforms, carrying US Army weapons, and using US Army vehicles, penetrated US lines to spread panic and confusion among US troops and to blow up bridges, ammunition dumps, and fuel stores and to disrupt the lines of communication. Many of the commandos were captured by the Americans. Because they were wearing US uniforms, a number of the Germans were executed as spies, either summarily or after military commissions.

=== After World War II ===
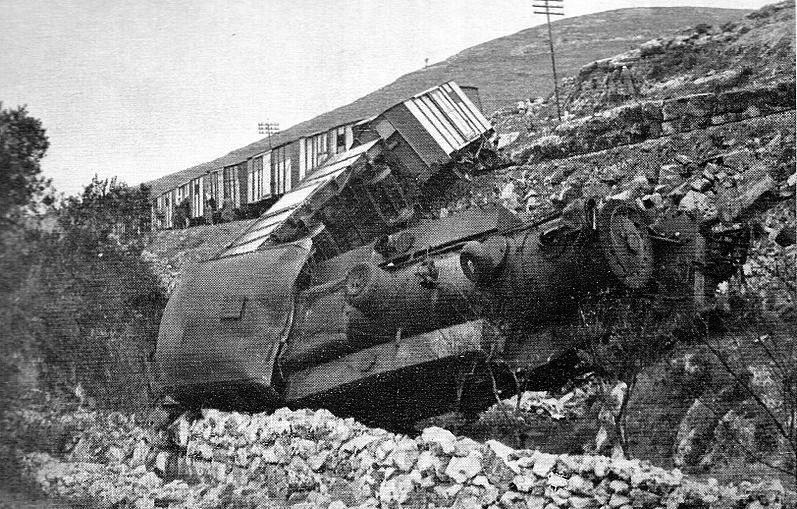
Palestine Railway's K class 2-8-4T steam locomotive and freight train on the Jaffa and Jerusalem line after being sabotaged by Jewish paramilitary forces in 1946.

From 1948 to 1960, the Malayan Communists committed numerous effective acts of sabotage against the British Colonial authorities, first targeting railway bridges, then hitting larger targets such as military camps. Most of their efforts were intended to weaken Malaysia's colonial economy and involved sabotage against trains, rubber trees, water pipes, and electric lines. The Communists' sabotage efforts were so successful that they caused backlash among the Malaysian population, who gradually withdrew support for the Communist movement as their livelihoods became threatened.

In Mandatory Palestine from 1945 to 1948, Jewish groups opposed British control. Though that control was to end according to the United Nations Partition Plan for Palestine in 1948, the groups used sabotage as an opposition tactic. The Haganah focused their efforts on camps used by the British to hold refugees, and radar installations that could be used to detect illegal immigrant ships. The Stern Gang and the Irgun used terrorism and sabotage against the British government and against lines of communications. In November 1946, the Irgun and Stern Gang attacked a railroad twenty-one times in a three-week period, eventually causing shell-shocked Arab railway workers to strike. The 6th Airborne Division was called in to provide security as a means of ending the strike.

=== In Cyprus ===
Sabotage against British Forces was one of the primary methods used by EOKA during the Cyprus liberation campaign in order to weaken the British posture on Cyprus. One of the more famous sabotage operations undertaken by EOKA was at RAF Akrotiri where 3 members of the organisation entered the base and placed multiple bombs undetected, destroying 4 English Electric Canberra aircraft and one de Havilland Venom aircraft.

=== In Vietnam ===
The Viet Cong used swimmer saboteurs often and effectively during the Vietnam War. Between 1969 and 1970, swimmer saboteurs sunk, destroyed, or damaged 77 assets of the U.S. and its allies. Viet Cong swimmers were poorly equipped but well-trained and resourceful. The swimmers provided a low-cost/low-risk option with high payoff; possible loss to the country for failure compared to the possible gains from a successful mission led to the obvious conclusion the swimmer saboteurs were a good idea.

=== During the Cold War ===
On 1 January 1984, the Cuscatlán Bridge over the Lempa river in El Salvador, critical to the flow of commercial and military traffic, was destroyed by guerrilla forces using explosives after using mortar fire to "scatter" the bridge's guards, causing an estimated $3.7 million in required repairs, and considerably impacting on El Salvadoran business and security.

In 1982 in Honduras, a group of nine Salvadorans and Nicaraguans destroyed a main electrical power station, leaving the capital city Tegucigalpa without power for three days.

== As crime ==
Some criminals have engaged in acts of sabotage for reasons of extortion. For example, Klaus-Peter Sabotta sabotaged German railway lines in the late 1990s in an attempt to extort DM10 million from the German railway operator Deutsche Bahn. He is now serving a sentence of life imprisonment. In 1989, ex-Scotland Yard detective Rodney Whitchelo was sentenced to 17 years in prison for spiking Heinz baby food products in supermarkets, in an extortion attempt on the food manufacturer.

On October 8, 2022, the GSM-R radio communication system of the Deutsche Bahn was sabotaged by the cutting of two cables of crucial importance. In the aftermath, the railway traffic in Northern Germany was completely shut down for several hours. German criminal police took over the investigation.

== In a coup d'etat ==
Sabotage is a crucial tool of the successful coup d'etat, which requires control of communications before, during, and after the coup is staged. Simple sabotages against physical communications platforms using semi-skilled technicians, or even those trained only for this task, could effectively silence the target government of the coup, leaving the information battle space open to the dominance of the coup's leaders. To underscore the effectiveness of sabotage, "A single cooperative technician will be able temporarily to put out of action a radio station which would otherwise require a full-scale assault."

Railroads, where strategically important to the regime the coup is against, are prime targets for sabotage—if a section of the track is damaged entire portions of the transportation network can be stopped until it is fixed.

== Derivative usages ==
=== Sabotage radio ===
A sabotage radio was a small two-way radio designed for use by resistance movements in World War II, and after the war often used by expeditions and similar parties.

=== Cybotage ===
Arquilla and Rondfeldt, in their work entitled Networks and Netwars, differentiate their definition of "netwar" from a list of "trendy synonyms", including "cybotage", a portmanteau from the words "sabotage" and "cyber". They dub the practitioners of cybotage "cyboteurs" and note while all cybotage is not netwar, some netwar is cybotage.

=== Counter-sabotage ===
Counter-sabotage, defined by Webster's Dictionary, is "counterintelligence designed to detect and counteract sabotage". The United States Department of Defense definition, found in the Dictionary of Military and Associated Terms, is "action designed to detect and counteract sabotage. See also counterintelligence".

==== In World War II ====
During World War II, British subject Eddie Chapman, trained by the Germans in sabotage, became a double agent for the British. The German Abwehr entrusted Chapman to destroy the British de Havilland Company's main plant which manufactured the outstanding Mosquito light bomber but required photographic proof from their agent to verify the mission's completion. A special unit of the Royal Engineers known as the Magic Gang covered the de Havilland plant with canvas panels and scattered papier-mâché furniture and chunks of masonry around three broken and burnt giant generators. Photos of the plant taken from the air reflected devastation for the factory and a successful sabotage mission, and Chapman, as a British sabotage double-agent, fooled the Germans for the duration of the war.

=== 21st-century examples ===
Since 2022, Russia has been accused of orchestrating a wide-ranging campaign of sabotage across Europe as part of its hybrid war. Incidents include confirmed arson attacks against factories and warehouses in Germany, Poland, and the UK, plots against military bases, and damage to critical infrastructure, all aimed at disrupting support for Ukraine.

=== Self-sabotage ===
In psychology, self-sabotage is defined as behaviour that undermines one's own existing or potential achievements.

== See also ==
- Accelerationism
- Birth control sabotage
- Edmund Charaszkiewicz
- Cichociemni
- Colin Gubbins
- Conspiracy
- Direct action
- Divide and Rule
- Espionage
- Fifth column
- Gaslighting
- Guerrilla warfare
- Improvised explosive device
- Industrial espionage
- Internet troll
- Kedyw
- Mutiny
- Norwegian heavy water sabotage
- Partisan
- Political warfare
- Provocateur
- Rail sabotage
- Hunt sabotage
- Civil disobedience
- Sedition
- Setting up to fail
- Shill
- Social undermining
- Special Activities Division
- Tampering
- Terrorism
- The Mole, TV series
