= Women in Data =

Women in Data®
- Founder: Roisin McCarthy
- Headquarters: United Kingdom
- Website: womenindata.co.uk

Women in Data® is an organisation and movement that aims to empower women and support them through the various stages of their careers in data. Although women comprise about 50% of the United Kingdom (UK) population, only 20% of professionals in artificial intelligence and data in the UK are women. Underrepresentation of women in data science can result in serious issues and in some cases, e.g., automobile crashes, actual harm. With a membership of over 110,000, the organisation seeks to improve the representation of women and girls in data and technology, address some of the key issues, and connect data professionals with partner companies.

== Summary ==
Founded in 2014 by Roisin McCarthy, Women in Data® was formed to promote diversity in analytics by encouraging more women to take up careers in the data industry. The organisation is dedicated to supporting and promoting women in the data and technology fields by providing an expansive platform for female and gender-diverse practitioners to share their technical knowledge and network at various in-person and virtual events.

Women in Data® has partnered with various organizations in the data and technology sector. The organization states that increased female participation in the sector could benefit UK businesses by expanding the talent pool.

== History ==
In 2014, with over fifteen years’ experience as a recruiter in data science and analytics, Roisin McCarthy observed an industry-wide relative decline in female candidates applying, scaling and remaining in the data sector. The gap in female applicants caused her to examine the underlying issues and potential barriers to women in the data and technology field and led her to collaborate with one of the UK's foremost data experts, Payal Jain. Women in Data® was formed to confront these problems and to advocate for change.

To bring awareness to the issues and to do something positive about them, Women in Data set about creating a community of professionals in which members could network, share ideas, and support and encourage one another. By design, the organisation offers a free membership to provide an opportunity to connect, engage and belong to this community.

Following many media appearances and networking events, in 2015, the organisation held its first major event at the University College London campus. The movement quickly gained traction, and by 2019, the conference welcomed more than 1,200 attendees to the InterContinental London - The O2. A report in 2019 noted that although women still hadn't been entering the sector at the same increasing rate that men had, there had never been a better time to be a woman in this field. In the following year, thousands more attended a week of virtual Women in Data events and workshops and by 2022, the community had grown to more than 30,000 members.

== Twenty in Data & Tech Awards ==
Established in 2017, Women in Data® collaborated with Edwina Dunn, Founder of The Female Lead, to create the Twenty in Data & Tech Awards. This annual showcase was designed to celebrate the achievements of women within the industry. Each year a selection of twenty women, at various stages in their careers, are awarded for their contributions to the Women in Data community.

== Partnerships ==
Maintaining partnerships with third-party organisations are an integral component of how Women in Data operates.

Today, Women in Data® have created over 50 partnerships with organisations on a national and global scale. Supporting partners have included corporations such as Snowflake, Sainsbury's, Google, Experian, Lloyds Banking Group, TUI Group, JPMorgan Chase, Johnson & Johnson, IBM, Lego, Microsoft, BT, Very Group, Marks & Spencer, Royal Bank of Scotland, Royal Mail and Hotels.com.

== Data For Good ==
=== Girls in Data ===
In 2020, Women in Data® went on to develop an initiative called Girls in Data. This initiative was developed to inspire young girls to embrace a career in the world of data and technology by introducing them to STEM subjects from their early teenage years. Teaming up with Edwina Dunn from The Female Lead on BBC South, the initiative first connected with female pupils at a Hampshire School to inspire and introduce positive role models to the students.

=== MenopauseX ===
In 2022, Women in Data® announced a further initiative, MenopauseX, in partnership with Newson Health Menopause Society and the Balance App. The initiative aims to improve the well-being of women by providing data insights and recommendations related to menopause. The MenopauseX team currently consists of a growing team of 25 volunteers - including data scientists, analysts and consultants.

=== Women’s Safety ===
Commencing in 2021, Women in Data®'s Women in Data Week centred on the topic of women's safety. As a consequence of the murder of Sarah Everard, the issue of women's safety was brought to the forefront of society as a whole and the organisation investigated how data can improve their safety. Joined by leading industry experts, survivors, technologists and partners at Kubrick and Snowflake, the group discussed "Data and its importance for Women’s Safety". This topic explored and debated how data strategy, protection, ethics and exploitation affect the lives of women.

=== Women’s Health ===
In partnership with Capgemini Invent, Women in Data® hosted a senior leader's session in May 2022, focussing on Women's Health. This was in recognition of the persistently poor healthcare outcomes that women face and the urgent need to tackle ingrained gender inequalities in the healthcare systems. The event brought together senior experts from a range of private and public sector organisations, including NHS England, Cancer Research UK and the Department of Health and Social Care. The mission of the event was to draw on the expertise of those in attendance to better understand the role that data plays - and could play – in improving women's health outcomes. The deductions produced on the day were presented in a whitepaper in July 2022 depicting the role data could play in addressing the issues - and the challenges that need to be overcome in doing so.
