= Tesco bomb campaign =

2000–2001 blackmail of British retailer

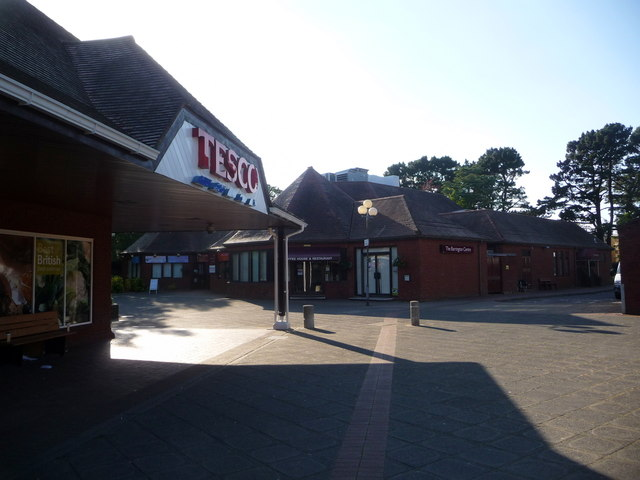
- The Ferndown Tesco, which received threatening letters during the campaign
- Date: August 2000 – February 2001
- Duration: 6 months
- Location: Bournemouth, England, United Kingdom
- Motive: Financial
- First reporter: Bournemouth Daily Echo
- Outcome: Convicted, serving 6 years of a 12 year imprisonment
- Injuries: 1
- Arrests: 1
- Suspects: 38
- Charges: Blackmail, nine counts; common assault, one count
- Trial: Dorchester Crown Court
- Verdict: Guilty on all counts
- Convictions: Robert Edward Dyer
- Sentence: 16 years' imprisonment, reduced to 12 years on appeal

From August 2000 to February 2001, a blackmailer identified by the pseudonym "Sally" threatened the British supermarket chain Tesco with bombing and harming customers if their demands were not met. The blackmailer demanded that Clubcards, modified to allow the withdrawal of cash from ATMs, be left in local newspapers. The attempted extortion started in Bournemouth, England, and led to one of the largest and most secretive operations ever undertaken by Dorset Police.

Several months after the threat first came to light, "Sally" sent out several letter bombs, one of which was received and exploded in the face of the recipient, causing her minor injuries. The Royal Mail intercepted several other letter bombs, which had been held up because insufficient stamps had been put on them. In October 2000, "Sally" threatened to use pipe bombs against Tesco customers and the threat was taken seriously enough that Tesco began the production of the modified Clubcards, but were unable to produce the required number before the deadline set by the blackmailer. In November, "Sally" claimed to have placed a pipe bomb in a garden in the Ferndown area of Dorset, but no bomb was found.

Police eventually mounted a surveillance operation on the postbox to which several of the extortion letters had been traced and identified "Sally" as Robert Edward Dyer. Dyer was arrested in February 2001, more than six months after the extortion attempt began, and was charged with several offences, including nine counts of blackmail and one of common assault; he was found guilty in May 2001. He was sentenced to 16 years' imprisonment on 12 June 2001, later reduced to 12 years on appeal. A number of similar extortion attempts against supermarket chains and other businesses and subsequent attacks on Tesco have since been compared to Dyer's campaign by the media.

== Beginnings ==
The campaign began in August 2000, when John Purnell, director of security for Tesco, the United Kingdom's largest supermarket chain, was telephoned by a newsagent in Bournemouth who had discovered a copy of an extortion letter left on his shop's photocopier. The letter demanded that Tesco give away Clubcards, modified for use in cash machines, with a combined value of £200,000 in the Bournemouth Daily Echo.

The letter, dated 22 August 2000, was written as follows [grammar and spelling mistakes have been adjusted]:

Without prejudice.

Very soon some people in the Bmth [Bournemouth] area will get small bombs sent to them. They will all be recent Tesco customers. These bombs will be very small, just a warning.

Unless you agree to my terms very quickly the bombs will get bigger and much more dangerous. They will all go to Tesco customers. Anyone seen shopping at Tesco will be a possible target. You can only stop this by meeting my terms.

You will have made enough Tesco loyalty cards to put one in every copy of the evening Echo [Bournemouth Daily Echo]. They will be encoded to work in ATM machines as Tesco bank cards. They will allow withdrawals of one thousand pounds per transaction with no limit on number of withdrawals per day. The pin number will be 3333. None of this is negotiable. Follow my instructions or your customers will be at risk. The risk will get bigger the longer you take to comply.

You will place ads in Wednesday copies of the Echo to pass messages to me. If required in personal ad's you will give a date by which you will have the cards ready for insertion and I *will* contact you and tell you the day to put them out.

This is not a bluff, I will carry out everything I say, only your compliance will protect your customers. I will give you a demonstration of the next level of bomb. Soon it will explode in a safe place but where it will not pass unrecorded. It is not my wish to hurt anyone, but I will do whatever is necessary to get what I want.

Sally

Police estimated that if Clubcards capable of withdrawing £1000 were placed in the Bournemouth Echo, which at the time had a circulation of 50,000, then Tesco could lose £50m a day (despite a later understanding that it was not possible to withdraw £1000 in one go). Tesco feared that, if the extortionist was to go on radio and give the pin code, this could have been a huge financial risk. Tesco determined that they could let a handful of the cards be used, before stopping the rest of them. Furthermore, catching "Sally" using an ATM would be a large task – police worked out there were approximately 25,000 ATM sites in the UK and approximately 250 in the conurbation area of Bournemouth. This would not have been an operation that Dorset Police could have carried out on their own.

== Initial investigation ==
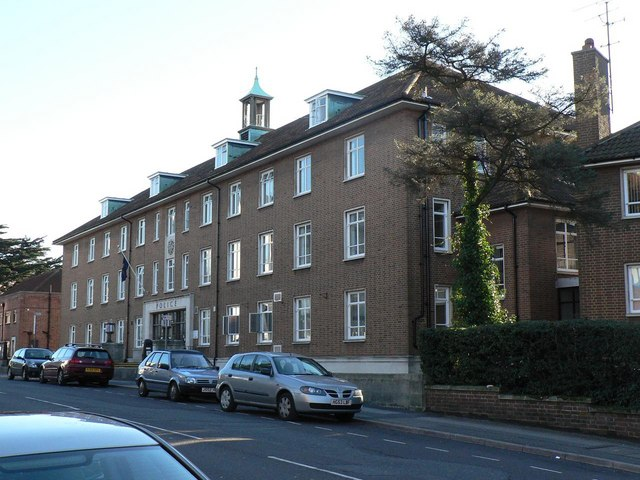
Bournemouth Police Station, where the investigation was carried out (the station in Bournemouth has since moved)

The police investigation into the campaign, codenamed Operation Hornbill, was one of the most secretive ever undertaken by Dorset Police and one of the largest in British policing history.

Approximately 100 officers worked on the enquiry, working 24 hours a day. Officers were selected across the whole of the Dorset area. Officers working on the investigation were not allowed to tell their colleagues what they were working on. This was to keep the investigation covert and related to a similar, historic case. In 1990, Rodney Whitchelo attempted to extort £4 million from H. J. Heinz Company by spiking jars of baby food with broken glass and caustic soda. The Metropolitan Police investigation revealed that Whitchelo had recently retired as a London Metropolitan Police detective. Dorset Police always had a concern that "Sally" was a police officer, notably from the terminology that was within the letters, giving the impression that it was legalese or police jargon.

In determining why Tesco was being targeted, police realised that Tesco had received a number of complaints, including civil litigation cases. Tesco stated that a number of employees had been dismissed for misconduct or had left the company with a grudge, potentially making them suspects. Police suspected that whilst "Sally" was an individual, wanting to make money for themselves, this individual may also have been part of a large criminal organisation, such as an anarchist group. It was questioned whether such a group would be attempting to get back at Tesco, or would be using Tesco to highlight their campaign.

=== Subsequent letters and communication attempt ===
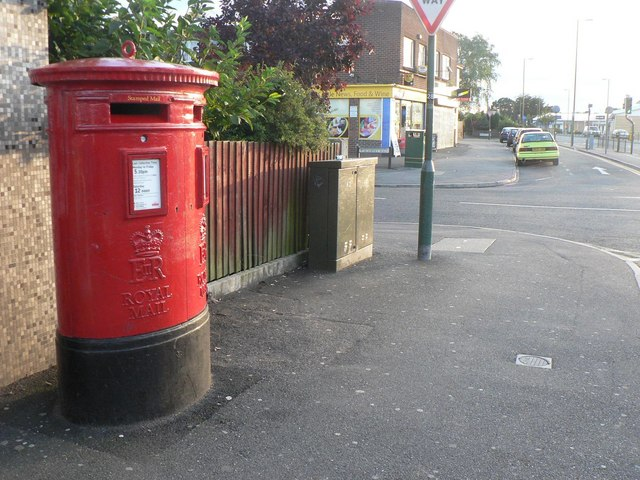
The postbox on Bradpole Road from which police discovered "Sally" had been sending letters

On 30 August 2000, Tesco received another letter, written to the manager at a Tesco store on Victoria Road in Ferndown. Whilst this letter was identical to the first letter, it was fire-damaged. It was wondered whether "Sally" had attempted to destroy the letter they had posted, after having second thoughts about sending it. This allowed police a potential lead, if they could discover if a postbox fire had occurred. Making enquiries with Royal Mail, police discovered that a fire had been reported in a postbox on Bradpole Road, Bournemouth.

Tesco received a third letter to their store in Ferndown, that was dated 29 August 2000. "Sally" wrote how small bombs had been prepared to be sent to customers homes and that bombs would get bigger if demands were not met.

After receiving the third letter, police did not want to make "Sally" feel they were ignoring the threats. Using an undercover police officer, police placed an advert in the Bournemouth Daily Echo, asking "Sally" to contact them, providing a phone number.

On 6 September 2000, the following ad was placed:

SAL You understand that we need to talk, lets sort this out together. Please phone

After receiving no response in three weeks, the senior investigating officer, Detective Superintendent Phil James, convened a meeting with other senior officers from across the United Kingdom to assess the threat posed. The meeting included officers from the Metropolitan Police and from the National Kidnap and Extortion Unit.

== Bombing and discovery of other devices ==
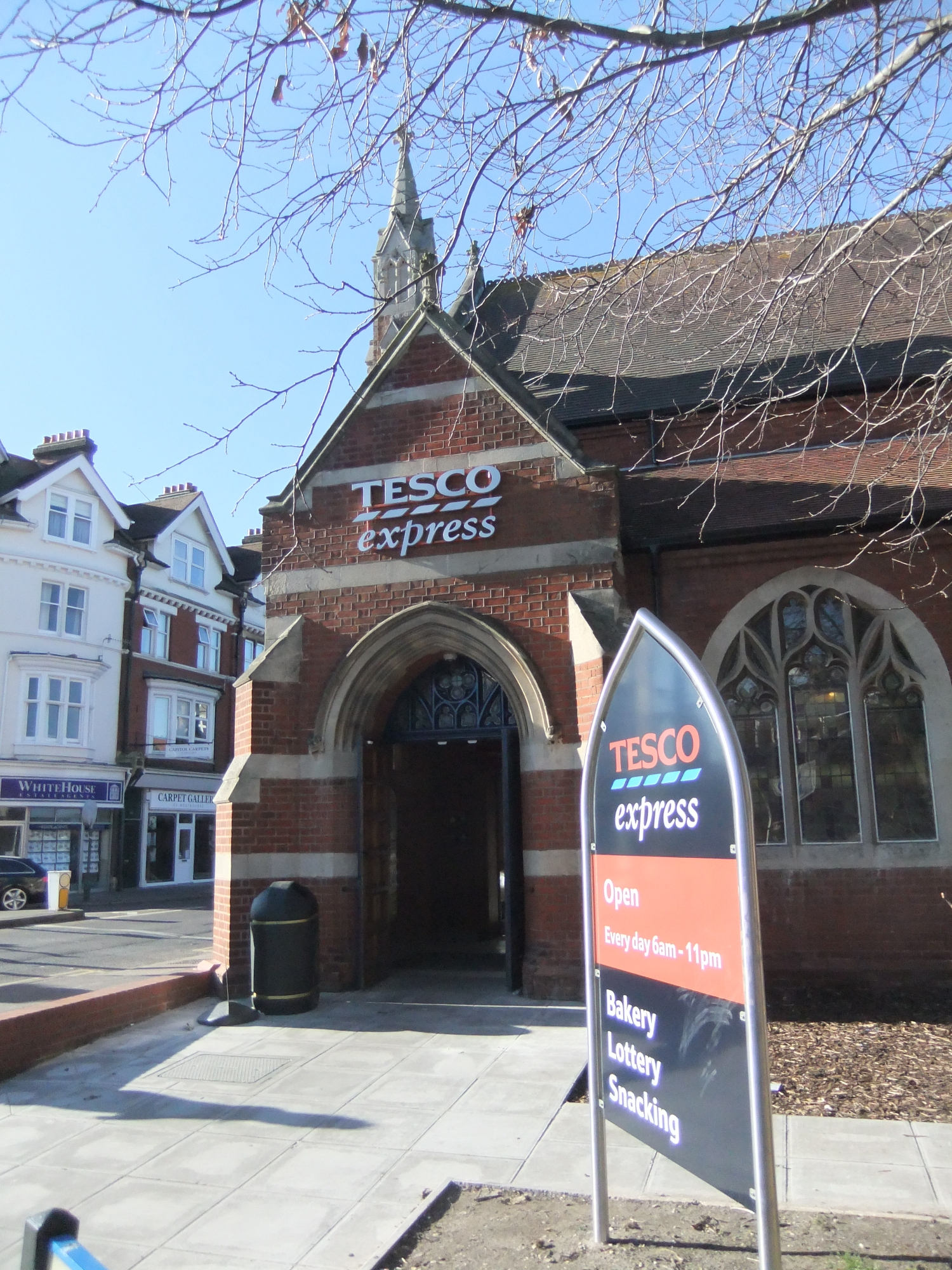
A Tesco store in Bournemouth

During James' meeting, he was informed that a letter bomb had exploded at an address in Ferndown. In a documentary about the investigation in 2009, James said "There was a knock at the door and I was told by one of my officers that in fact, an incendiary device, a firebomb, had just gone off. The atmosphere of the meeting suddenly changed. Clearly there was a risk and the threat was very, very real."

Jean Evans, then aged 70, opened the letter bomb, which exploded in her face. She was taken to hospital with minor injuries – two weeks earlier, Evans had left intensive care at hospital. A bomb disposal team from the British Army was dispatched to the scene. They discovered the remains of a 'very small amount of incendiary composition', which was inside a cassette case in the letter. The device had used a party popper to detonate gunpowder inside the A4/A5 size envelope. Whilst not considered a lethal device, there was the risk that it could have set fire to the address and, as was seen, it had injured Evans.

Immediately after the first letter bomb, Dorset Police alerted Royal Mail to look out for suspicious packages. Within hours of warning Royal Mail, a nearby sorting office called, having located three suspicious packages. The packages had been delayed from being sent because insufficient stamps had been placed on them. Police arrived and evacuated the immediate area before the bomb disposal team arrived. Using a portable X-ray machine to ensure that "Sally" had not made a bigger device, the bomb disposal team scanned the packages, before disarming the parcels by hand.

A further seven of the 'menacing letters' were delivered to the homes of Tesco customers, stating that they had been seen shopping at Tesco, that they had been followed home and that they may be subject to more threats or bombs through the post.

Tesco attempted to reassure their customers, placing signs outside their stores, that read:

You may be aware that some Tesco customers in the Bournemouth area have been sent suspect packages containing devices.'

- If you receive one of these packages DO NOT OPEN or MOVE it - dial 999
- Tesco is working with the Police on this matter. If you have any information contact Dorset Police...or Tesco...

During a press conference on 21 September 2000, as part of a wider public warning, then Dorset Police Assistant Chief Constable, Chris Lee said: "'We're advising members of the public to be extremely vigilant and exercise caution regarding any suspicious or unaccepted packages they receive'."

ACC Lee added: "The reason for singling out the supermarket chain is at this time unclear and our inquiries into any motive are being investigated. Our attempts to make contact with the blackmailer have been unsuccessful".

Following the spate of letter bombs, the Army's bomb disposal team was stationed in Bournemouth—something that only usually happens when political party conferences are held in the town—and placed on stand-by.

== Subsequent investigations ==
The police placed two more adverts in the Bournemouth Daily Echo. The first said:

SALL You didn't get back to me. You must have missed my last message. I have problems of my own. We can work this out together if you get in touch. Please write or phone: 01992 634970.

The next advert said:

SALL - I'm not reluctant. Doing all I can but finding it difficult to do as much each day. Please understand this will take time. I'll explain on 01202 48876. See you on Saturday.

Although the letters from "Sally" appeared to target Tesco, it appeared a local issue as the letters were sent to a local store in Ferndown, the postbox fire that occurred was in Bournemouth and the demand for clubcards to be placed was in a newspaper in Bournemouth. DSI James assumed that the offender was also local. A specialist unit of geographic profilers were added to the investigation, in order to analyse the crimes that "Sally" had committed in order to work out where they may live. The locations of the crime scenes of the newsagents the letter was found at, the site of the first bombing, and the burned-out postbox were all logged. A computer analysed the locations which produced a focus-area for police. It supported the theory that "Sally" was local to the Bournemouth area. An area profile of approximately a mile squared was created and the geographic profiling team stated the areas where police should focus their enquiries.

Suspects that lived within the catchment zone were placed under surveillance. Suspects included employees with links to people named "Sally" and people with links to the Tesco store in Ferndown. DSI James always believed that "Sally" would be caught through the postbox at Bradpole Road in Bournemouth, which "Sally" had used at the beginning of September and would likely use again. Covert officers put the postbox under surveillance, using officers and a camera.

The October letter had also been traced back to the postbox on Bradpole Road through the times in which the postbox was emptied. A camera covering the area of the postbox had captured "Sally". The footage from the surveillance operation was reviewed, but was deemed as useless, since it was impossible for people seen on the surveillance footage to be identified and further hampered by the poor image quality.

=== Fallback strategy ===
Whilst surveillance was underway, police asked Tesco to consider a fallback strategy if the bombings were to escalate. This was to consider putting the cards into the Bournemouth Daily Echo that "Sally" had requested. The head of security at Tesco had fears about people being hurt, Tesco's reputation being damaged and the company losing money around the decisions he was agreeing to.

The fallback strategy was similar to a previous case. In 1990, Edgar Pearce, dubbed the "Mardi Gras bomber" by the media, used bombs in an attempt to extort money from Barclays Bank and Sainsbury's supermarkets. Like "Sally", Pearce had also wanted to receive his money through ATMs. However, hundreds of ATMs were placed on around-the-clock surveillance, leading to Pearce's arrest. Tesco's position was that they would not pay any extortionist but would consider their support to a police operation in 'paying money in a controlled fashion'.

=== Response ===
Another threatening letter was sent in October, whereby "Sally" explained they were fed up with Dorset Police stalling and that they needed to meet the demands. A further threat was made to place a pipe bomb in the garden of a Tesco customer, capable of killing people. Police consulted with the bomb disposal team, who stated that, if "Sally" was capable of making the previous devices, they were more than capable of making a pipe-bomb that could injure or kill people. "Sally"s' letter did not state where or when they would plant the device.

The letter contained a three-part cipher which allowed the police to communicate with "Sally" in code through cryptic adverts in the Bournemouth Daily Echo. Instead of having to be vague in the paper as before, due to members of the public being able to read the adverts, police could now be clearer with their communications, as only they and "Sally" had the cipher.

DSI James contacted the editor of the Echo, Neal Butterworth. James asked Butterworth to attend the police station, explaining to him that no-one could know that they were meeting. He explained to Butterworth that Dorset Police and "Sally" had previously been communicating through classified adverts in the paper, which Butterworth was 'gobsmacked', but 'fascinated', by. James explained that he wanted to work with the Bournemouth Daily Echo to get further messages to "Sally". Butterworth was required to speak to the advertising manager and general manager as to why free adverts were going into the paper, whilst not being able to tell them why. The police were allowed to place the messages in the Echo, disguised as Mensa puzzles and made to look like word searches.

=== Further communication with "Sally" ===
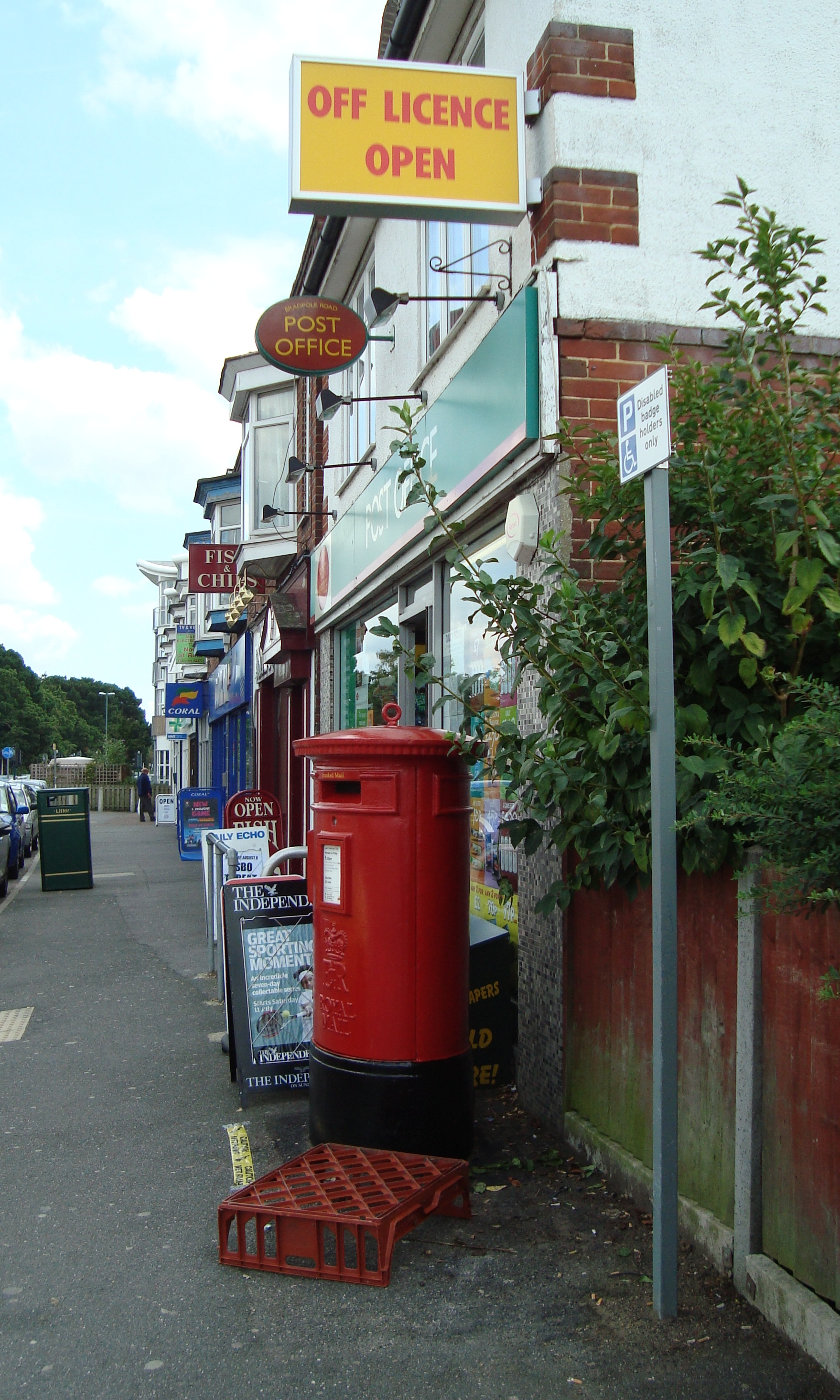
Police had surveillance cameras covering this postbox, including in the window of a newsagents

After being unable to identify "Sally" on the surveillance footage, police placed another message in the Bournemouth Daily Echo, asking whether "Sally" would accept a money-drop instead of collecting the money through ATMs, as it was 'technically impossible' to produce the cards. The plan was that officers would be waiting for "Sally" to collect the money. However, "Sally" replied that only the technical requirements that had been demanded were wanted by them and that they did not believe the police could not meet the demands, thinking they were stalling. After this exchange between police and "Sally", communication from "Sally" stopped.

Police were not sure whether their messages were getting through to "Sally" and, as a result, were concerned that an explosive device would be detonated. However, on 16 November 2000, "Sally" got back in communication, having lost patience. A letter stated that a pipe bomb would be placed in the garden of a Tesco customer if the demands were not met by 12 December 2000, prompting police to seriously consider producing the modified Clubcards.

Police heightened their surveillance of the postbox on Bradpole Road. This included the use of seven cameras to provide extensive coverage of the postbox, with cameras on top of the postbox, a fisheye camera in the window of the newsagents near to the postbox and other cameras that covered the road.

Police discovered that they could not produce sufficient cards by the deadline, prompting them to try and get more time. They explained that they were attempting to meet the demands but would not be able to get the Clubcards ready before the deadline, attempting to get "Sally" to extend the time they had. Approximately 100,000 Clubcards, modified for use in ATMs, were eventually produced, but none were distributed.

At the end of November, on 29 November 2000, a week before the deadline, "Sally" sent another letter, that said [grammar and spelling mistakes have been adjusted]:

Without prejudice.

You are wasting time. The date was clear. You will distribute the cards in the Echo on Wednesday 13 December at the latest. You have only to set up the PO Box to sort out the pin. No do not waste them trying to set up meetings or drops. You have the code if you have something important to say but this date is final and the cards are the only thing that will stop me. To prove this, I will post this on Saturday 2 December. By the time you receive it, I will have hidden a garden bomb in the garden of a Tesco customer. It is safe unless it is disturbed. Page 15, square E5.

Sally

The letter outlined that a bomb had been planted in the BH22 area of Ferndown, in West Parley. The grid reference covered a square kilometre, including 19 roads and 550 houses. The claim prompted the mobilisation of hundreds of police officers and military personnel to the area, but no bomb was found. The only scare was a few apprentices at a local garage, who had exploded hydrogen balloons whilst police were searching the nearby area, causing police to rush to the scene and discover it was a false alarm.

A further letter was sent to police, dated 6 December, where "Sally" stated that they had not planted a device, but if the police stalled, there was the threat of a bomb being planted. Additional high-visibility patrols were put out in the area, including 'bomb cars' that could respond to calls from the public, in relation to suspect devices.

=== Surveillance of the Bradpole Road postbox ===
The letter from “Sally” that revealed the Ferndown garden bomb to be a hoax was traced to a postbox on Bradpole Road. It had been posted whilst the heightened surveillance operation was taking place. However, as it was the run-up to Christmas, a number of people had been using the postbox, meaning that "Sally" was one of 38 people who had used the postbox, in which 172 letters had been deposited. Royal Mail regulations meant that detectives could not open or delay the letters, so they made enquiries with the recipients to identify the senders, having 5–10 minutes to gather as much information they could from the letters before the delivery of the letters had to continue. They eventually managed to identify all but a small number of the senders, contacting them, pretending to be managers from the Royal Mail. They explained that there was an issue with the mail in their area, asking the recipients to tell them who had sent them the letter, in order for enquiries to be made with the sender.

Meanwhile, surveillance officers remained at the postbox. If a suspect was spotted, police could follow them. In some cases, police were able to follow suspects from the postbox back to their home address or vehicle, allowing police to make further enquiries based on the address or registration plate. This was a risky operation – if "Sally" was to be aware of the surveillance operation, they could destroy evidence. By this point, the enquiry had been going on for nearly six months.

In late December 2000, surveillance officers identified a suspect who used the postbox. One of the 38 people seen on the surveillance recording was a local police officer who worked in the Bournemouth area. The officer was interviewed by detectives, however, after a few hours, it was clear that the officer was not "Sally".

=== Identification and arrest ===
Robert Edward Dyer
- Born: 1949/1950
- Occupations: Electrician, failed businessman
- Known for: Attempting to extort money from Tesco by sending explosives to customers in the post
- Status: Released
- Motive: Financial
- Convictions: Blackmail, nine counts; common assault, one count
- Criminal charges: Blackmail, nine counts; common assault, one count
- Penalty: 16 years' imprisonment, reduced to 12 years' imprisonment on appeal

Details
- Victims: Tesco (blackmail), Jean Evans (common assault)
- Span of crimes: 2000–2001
- Country: United Kingdom
- Locations: Ferndown, Dorset
- Targets: Tesco and their customers
- Killed: 0
- Injured: 1
- Weapon: Improvised explosive devices (IEDs)
- Date apprehended: 19 February 2001
- Imprisoned at: 2001 - 2007

Weeks of work had eliminated all but nine of the thirty-eight people who had used the Bradpole Road letterbox. On 17 February 2001, over six months after the receipt of the first demand and three months since the last letter from "Sally", the police made a major breakthrough. Detective Constable Alan Swanton, a junior detective on the case, spotted one of the people caught by the surveillance of the postbox who had yet to be identified. The man was carrying a fuel container, which Swanton believed had come from a nearby filling station. Officers obtained CCTV footage from the filling station, where their suspect had paid by cheque, and identified the man as Robert Edward Dyer, a man with no previous convictions, who lived in the Kinson area of Bournemouth.

Dyer, at the time, was a 51-year-old unsuccessful businessman, electrician, and widower. He had raised his two teenage daughters alone since the 1992 death of his wife. His wife had died under 'mysterious circumstances', with an inquest reporting how Dyer had suffered a heart attack whilst his wife strangled herself with a ligature, after they had both been drinking.

He was placed under surveillance, in the hope that he would be seen to post a letter or to visit Tesco stores. The surveillance operation did not yield any results; instead Dyer spent most of his time visiting his elderly mother and carrying out errands.

It was decided that police would visit Dyer at his home address and would use a specialised software on a disc to examine his computer. The software would then search the hard drive of the computer, looking for specific words that had been used in the letters. If the software located any of the words, it would display on the screen what document the words related to. This had been done on other suspects to eliminate them as a suspect from the enquiry.

The police decided to confront Dyer and visited him at his home address, a two-bedroom bungalow in Caroline Road, Kinson, on 19 February 2001. Whilst officers sat with Dyer in the lounge and asked him questions, DS Phil Swanton went into Dyer's bedroom, locating a computer. DS Swanton started scanning the computer with the software. The software indicated that some of the specific words it was looking for had been located, displaying a demand letter.

Dyer was arrested, with DS Swanton explaining his arrest was without pushback from Dyer. DS Swanton received a phone call from his team, to which he stated he thought they were trying to anger him. Dyer was interviewed by police for several days, whereby he was given the opportunity to provide an account. Police questioned why Dyer could not remember sitting at his computer and drafting a letter. Dyer replied "I don't understand it either, but that is the case." No direct admissions were made by Dyer about him committing the offences. Dyer stated he did not understand why he had done what he had either.

Dyer's home address was searched and in the kitchen, within the gas boiler, a folded up piece of paper was located that contained the coded notes, with the code being in Dyer's handwriting and being unique to the enquiry. On the day Dyer's home address was searched, police intercepted the final letter from "Sally", which surveillance footage showed Dyer posting the day before he was arrested and which was an exact match to the letter found on Dyer's computer. The letter was dated 15 February 2001 and reads as follows (with grammar and spelling mistakes adjusted):

Without prejudice

Do not understand mardi gra. You have not complied until I have the cards and they are working to my satisfaction. If unable to use Echo, distribute as inserts in Exchange and Mart. I know this is possible, so do not stall. Cards to be in every copy on sale in 20KM radius of Bournemouth. No more messages, no more talk. Notify date of distribution in personal section [of the] Echo [on] Wednesday or Saturday. Distribution must take place by [the] end of [the] month. No excuses or garden bombs will be deployed [on the] first week of March. Season has moved on, people will soon be working in gardens, so do not delay.

Sally

It was discovered that everything involved in the incidents, including the letter writing and bomb making, had been conducted by Dyer at his home address. Within his shed, Dyer had made the devices and he had worn rubber gloves and used water, instead of his saliva, to put stamps on the letters, in an attempt to avoid detection. As Dyer's interviews continued, it was found that he had read the previous extortion cases that the police had identified, of Rodney Whitchelo and Edgar Pearce. It emerged that whilst Dyer had been sat in a doctor's surgery, he had read a copy of the Reader's Digest, which contained the story of Pearce, that inspired Dyer to commit his offences. The pseudonym "Sally" originated from the name of a dog Dyer had once owned.

== Trial and conviction ==
On 4 May 2001, Dyer appeared at Dorchester Crown Court and pleaded guilty on nine counts of blackmail, as well as a sole count of common assault against Jean Evans, the woman who opened the letter bomb. Prosecutor Derwin Hope stated: "The evidence shows clearly that this is a very devious man. What it revealed is a deliberate sustained and indeed cunning blackmail that was only stopped by massive police resources", while defending attorney Richard Onslow claimed that the four devices were not intended to injure, since they were assembled from party poppers and gunpowder from a 12-bore cartridge.

On 11 June 2001, he was sentenced to 16 years' imprisonment at the same court. The sentence was reduced to 12 years' imprisonment on appeal. Recorder Christopher Clarke told Dyer: "Your sentence is intended to act as a deterrent to anyone else like you who may be tempted to follow the example of Witchelo."

During the trial, it emerged that Dyer had worn gloves to avoid leaving fingerprints on the letters and used water to stick the stamps rather than licking them, but that he had made errors, such as leaving a copy of an extortion demand on a newsagent's photocopier; however, there is speculation that this was done so his letter would reach Tesco by a person other than himself.

== Aftermath ==
It was found that Dyer had no connection with Tesco. It emerged that Dyer had needed money to 'bail out' his video shop business, which at the time was not successful. DS Swanton later stated Dyer's motivation was 'purely a financial one' and that Dyer was an 'incredibly dangerous man'.

Dyer's house in Caroline Road, Kinson, was put up for sale in June 2001, for £87,500. Described as a "modest property", it had fallen into a state of disrepair since Dyer had been arrested. The Bournemouth Daily Echo ran the story about Dyer's case across seven pages and, for the first time, could tell readers how they had helped Dorset Police bring Dyer to justice. DSI James later said: “The fact that this part of the operation proved successful and remained confidential does prove that trust can operate between the police and the media.

Later incidents of extortion, similar to that of Dyer's, have also been compared to his campaign, including another extortion case against Tesco in 2007.

Dyer was released from prison on licence in 2007 and at that time still lived in southern England.

An episode of the crime documentary series Real Crime was made about the campaign in 2009 and broadcast by ITV. The documentary featured interviews with Neal Butterworth, then-editor of the Bournemouth Daily Echo and DSI James, the police officer who led the investigation, as well as DS Phil Swanton and DC Alan Swanton.

== See also ==
- Tesco blackmail plot – an extortion attempt against Tesco and which led to the largest blackmail investigation in the UK, between 2018 and 2020, where an extortionist threatened to contaminate baby food with salmonella, white powder and knives.
