= Klaus-Peter Sabotta =

Railway accident caused by sabotage

Klaus-Peter Sabotta was an extortionist who sabotaged German railways in December 1998, only six months after the Eschede disaster. He claimed to represent former employees of the German railway operator Deutsche Bahn who had been made redundant, and demanded a ransom of DM10 million. His motive for the crime was a need to pay off heavy debts he had incurred in his business activities.

The first act of tampering, near Wilmersdorf was detected and repaired before any train passed, while a second attack on the InterCityExpress line at the small town of Uchtspringe, 60 kilometres north of Magdeburg, failed to derail its intended target.

The third act of sabotage, near Anklam resulted in the derailment of a northbound freight train. Had a passenger train due at the time not been half an hour late, it would have smashed into the wreckage of the freight train.

He was arrested as he attempted to collect the ransom at a filling station just off the A8 in Irschenberg, Bavaria. On 4 February 2000 he was convicted of attempted murder and attempted extortion, and sentenced to life imprisonment.

== See also ==
- October 2022 German railway attack
