= Norlington =

Norlington may refer to:

- Norlington, East Sussex, a hamlet in Ringmer parish, England
- Norlington School, a school in London, England
