= Edwina Dunn =

English entrepreneur (born 1958)

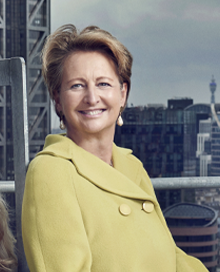
- Born: 29 May 1958 (age 68); Buxton, Derbyshire
- Education: Surbiton High School; Bournemouth University (BA)
- Known for: Co-founder of dunnhumby CEO of Starcount Founder of The Female Lead
- Spouse: Clive Humby (1982)
- Children: 2

Edwina D. Dunn, OBE (born May 29, 1958) is an English entrepreneur in the field of data science and customer business strategy. Since 2014, she has been the chief executive officer of the consumer insights company Starcount. She is also the founder of The Female Lead campaign. At the end of 2018, she was appointed to the board of the Government Centre for Data Ethics & Innovation.

== Early life and education ==
Dunn was born in Buxton, Derbyshire. She spent her first three years in Rio de Janeiro, Brazil where her father, a former Spitfire pilot, worked as a chartered electrical engineer on a power station project.

After her family returned to the U.K., Dunn won a scholarship to Surbiton High School. She attended Bournemouth University, graduating in 1979 with a B.A. in Geography.

== Career ==
In 1980, Dunn joined the London division of the American data analysis software consultants, CACI, as a marketing assistant, and was later promoted to Vice President.

In 1989, Dunn left CACI to become the joint founder and CEO of global consumer insights company Dunnhumby with her husband and long-term business partner Clive Humby. From their relationship with Tesco, they launched the Clubcard, the first mass customization loyalty program in the world, in 1995. Dunnhumby has offices in 25 countries.

Dunn and Humby sold their final stake in Dunnhumby to Tesco in 2011 for a reported £96 million. Dunn wrote the book The Old Rectory Gardens at Doynton., and instigated the What I See project, later the Female Lead campaign.

In 2012, Dunn and Humby set up H&D Ventures, a business and data science team exploring the possibilities of telecoms and financial services data. In 2013, Dunn and Humby, acquired Purple Seven, a UK theatre and arts analytics company .

Since November 2018, Dunn has been a member of the Centre for Data Ethics and Innovation’s board and was appointed as Deputy Chair in November 2020. Dunn is a part of the board of Geospatial Commissions, an advisory board to the government of the United Kingdom.

== Philanthropy ==
Dunn has been a trustee of the Science Museum Foundation since 2013. She was a non-executive director of HMRC from 2013 to 2016 and University Technical Colleges with Lord Kenneth Baker from 2015 to 2017.

From 2014 to 2017, Dunn was chair of the government-backed, private sector-sponsored Your Life campaign, which sought to promote STEM subjects (Science, Technology, Engineering, and Maths) to 14-16 year-old students across the UK. It involved the creation of Future Finder, a careers advice app.

Dunn is the founder of The Female Lead, a non-profit organization dedicated to providing positive leadership models for women. It provides a platform for sharing inspirational stories and films. The accompanying book, The Female Lead: Women Who Shape Our World, was published by Penguin Random House in February 2017. It is being donated to 18,000 schools across the UK and USA. In 2020, Dunn bought the autograph suit of Sandy Powell at auction; she then donated it on behalf of The Female Lead to the Theatre and Performance Collection of the Victoria and Albert Museum (V&A) in London.

== Awards and honours ==
In 2018, Dunn received the Fashion 4 Development Award for Women's empowerment in New York City. She was awarded an Order of the British Empire (OBE) in the 2019 Queens Birthday Honours for Services to Data and Business in the UK.

Dunn holds two Honorary Doctorates: one in Business Administration from Derby University, and one in Science from Middlesex University, Kingston and Bournemouth. She also holds three Honorary Fellowships: at Lucy Cavendish College, Cambridge, the Institute of Direct & Digital Marketing, and the Market Research Society, of which she is also Patron.

== Personal life ==
She married Clive Humby in 1982 and has two children.
