= Dunnhumby =

Customer data science company

Dunnhumby Limited
- Formerly: Claymore Systems Limited (1989–1989); Dunn Humby Associates Limited (1989–2000)
- Type: Private (subsidiary of Tesco)
- Industry: Marketing
- Founded: 24 May 1989
- Headquarters: Hammersmith, London, England, United Kingdom
- Number of locations: 50 offices in 30+ countries
- Area served: Worldwide
- Key people: Jamie Samaha (CEO; July 2026–present)
- Products: Tesco Clubcard, among others
- Services: Data Consultancy; Customer Knowledge; Customer Engagement; Category Optimization; Price & Promotions; Supplier Engagement; Supplier Engagement
- Revenue: £362.6m (2022)
- Net income: £32.1m (2022)
- Total assets: £247m (2022)
- Number of employees: 2,308 (2022)
- Parent: Tesco
- Subsidiaries: KSS Retail, BzzAgent, Sociomantic
- Website: www.dunnhumby.com

Dunnhumby Limited (stylized in all lowercase) is a global customer data science company.

== Formation ==
The company was formed by husband and wife team Clive Humby and Edwina Dunn. Humby was a University of Sheffield trained mathematician and the couple both worked at Caci. Wanting to start his own business, Humby resigned from Caci and left on the day that Dunn was dismissed. The couple started Dunnhumby in 1989, in the kitchen of their Chiswick, west London home. The company began working with clients, including Cable & Wireless and BMW.

In May 2018, Dunnhumby acquired marketing and promotions management company Aptaris.

== Tesco Clubcard ==
Dunnhumby originally gained prominence for helping establish Tesco Clubcard. In 1994, Tesco, which was second in the UK retail market to Sainsbury's, wanted to create a new loyalty card. The man responsible for Tesco's trials, Grant Harrison, attended a conference where Clive Humby was speaking.

Harrison agreed a trial with Tesco's then marketing director Terry Leahy and, after successful trials throughout 1994, the company was asked to present their findings. The first response from the board came from Tesco's then-Chairman Lord MacLaurin, who said, "What scares me about this is that you know more about my customers after three months than I know after 30 years."

== Current business ==
Tesco originally bought a 53% stake in 2001 for a reported £30m, increasing this to 84% in 2006, before purchasing the rest of the shares. The company employs more than 2,500 people in 30+ countries, selling information from a 40-terabyte database to companies including Procter & Gamble, Coca-Cola and US retailer Kroger. Dunn and Humby resigned from the company in October 2010 and remained non-executive directors through early 2013. Dunn and Humby invested in the theatre analytics business Purple Seven in 2013.

KSS Retail, a provider of analytics software and services for retail price optimization and promotions planning, was acquired by Dunnhumby in 2010. Founded in Manchester, UK, KSS Retail operated as a separate business unit until October 2015, when it was rebranded as Dunnhumby Price and Promotion. KSS Retail developed and commercialized optimization software called PriceStrat that helps retailers identify the right prices and promotions as part of a revenue management and merchandising strategy. Through Dunnhumby Price and Promotion, the business also provides artificial intelligence software that helps retailers with promotions and market basket analytics.

BzzAgent, a Boston-based social marketing and advocacy start-up, was acquired by Dunnhumby in 2011. Founded in 2001, BzzAgent runs word-of-mouth networks in North America, Brazil and the United Kingdom, enlisting unpaid volunteers to try products from companies including Procter & Gamble, Unilever and L’Oréal, then share opinions about those products with others, in-person and online. PowerReviews acquired BzzAgent from Dunnhumby in July 2018.

Berlin-based global advertising technology firm Sociomantic was acquired by Dunnhumby in 2014, according to Dunnhumby's then CEO Simon Hay, to improve customers' online experiences by "mak[ing] online content personalised for people, based on what they actually like, want and need." The company, founded in 2009, uses real-time bidding technology to purchase and display personalized digital advertising in milliseconds. Sociomantic operates in over 60 markets and 19 offices worldwide.

Given the trading difficulty at Tesco, in autumn 2014, it was suggested that the company might be on offer for sale at £2 billion. The BBC reported in January 2015 that Tesco was seeking a buyer for the company. In April 2015, The Kroger Company announced it would buy much of Dunnhumby USA and create a new consumer insights subsidiary called 84.51°, effective immediately. In February 2017, after 25 years, Hay stepped down as CEO.

In March 2019, Dunnhumby announced a partnership with Canadian supermarket Metro to help deliver more relevant customer experiences through the use of data.

In 2022, Dunnhumby's revenue was £362.6m with a reported profit of £32.1m.
