= Clive Humby =

British mathematician

Clive Humby OBE
- Born: Clive Robert Humby; 3 February 1955 (age 71); Leicester, England
- Education: Wyggeston Grammar School, Sheffield University
- Employer: Starcount
- Known for: Co-founder of dunnhumby
- Spouse: Edwina Dunn (m. 1982)
- Children: 2

Clive Robert Humby OBE (born 3 February 1955) is a British mathematician and entrepreneur in the field of data science and customer-centric business strategies. Since 2014, he has been Chief Data Scientist of the consumer insights company, Starcount.

== Early life and education ==
Humby was born in Leicester. He attended Sheffield University from 1972 to 1975, graduating with a B.Sc. in Applied Mathematics & Computer Science.

== Career ==
Humby joined American data analysis specialists CACI in 1976.

He worked on a project that used data from the 1970 census to plan locations for U.S. Army recruitment offices following the abolition of the draft. He returned to CACI’s UK office in 1977 and contributed to the development of the Acorn classification system.

In 1989, Humby left CACI to become joint founder and Chief Data Officer of global consumer insights business, dunnhumby, with his wife and long-term business partner, Edwina Dunn. The company applied science and technology to customer data, to help businesses understand consumer trends and behaviours. From their relationship with Tesco, they launched the Clubcard in 1995 - the first mass customisation loyalty programme in the world. Dunnhumby has offices in 25 countries employing 1500 people.

In 2006, Humby coined the phrase “Data is the new oil”. Michael Palmer expanded on Humby's quote by saying, like oil, data is “valuable, but if unrefined it cannot really be used. [Oil] has to be changed into gas, plastic, chemicals, etc to create a valuable entity that drives profitable activity; so, data must be broken down and analysed for it to have value.”

Humby and Dunn sold their stake in dunnhumby to Tesco in 2011. In 2012, they set up H&D Ventures, a business and data science team exploring the possibilities of telecoms and financial services data. In 2013, they became investors in Purple Seven, a theatre and arts analytics company, to evaluate the cultural behaviour of 19 million UK consumers.

In 2014, Humby was invited to join Starcount as Chief Data Scientist and the company acquired H&D Ventures in the process. Starcount is a data and analytics consultancy focused on exploring and extracting data-based insights.

Humby espouses "The Power of Two" leadership principle. This teaches that the most effective way to operate is by pairing two people with complementary skills, e.g., analysts and marketers. It is a model he and Dunn instigated at dunnhumby, and which he continues to advocate to this day.

== Personal life ==
He married Edwina Dunn in 1982. They have two children.

Humby is a trustee of the Royal Academy, as well as chairman of the Friends of the Royal Academy.

== Board directorships and honours ==
He was awarded an OBE for "services to Data and UK Business" in the 2019 Birthday Honours.

He is on the retail advisory board of LetterOne, an international investment business. He is also a board director of Holland & Barrett.

Humby holds honorary doctorates in engineering from the University of Sheffield, and in Business Administration from Kingston University London. He is an Honorary Companion of the Operational Research Society. He holds Honorary Fellowships of the Institute of Mathematics and its Applications, the Institute of Direct & Digital Marketing, and the Market Research Society of which he is also Patron.

== Books ==
Humby is a coauthor with Terry Hunt and Tim Phillips of the book Scoring Points: How Tesco is Winning Customer Loyalty, on the history of the Tesco Clubcard.
