= Pedigree Petfoods and Heinz extortion campaign =

Extortion against Pedigree Petfoods and Heinz, through contamination of products

- Date: August 1988 - 21 October 1990
- Duration: 26 months
- Location: Basildon and Rayleigh, Essex, United Kingdom
- Motive: Financial
- Outcome: Convicted, sentenced to 17 years imprisonment
- Injuries: 5
- Arrests: 1
- Suspects: 1
- Charges: 18 charges including blackmail, demanding money with menaces and contaminating food products (contrary to section 38(1) of the Public Order Act 1986)
- Trial: Old Bailey, East London, England
- Verdict: Guilty
- Convictions: Rodney Whitchelo
- Sentence: 17 years imprisonment (of which Whitchelo served half)

In the late 1980s, an extortion attempt against Pedigree Petfoods and Heinz began, during which an extortionist contaminated tins of dog and baby food in the United Kingdom. Pedigree was advised by police to pay limited sums to the extortionist, while ATMs were put under surveillance. Heinz lost millions in sales and eventually offered a £100,000 reward for clues, which the extortionist attempted to collect. However, he was arrested at an ATM while trying to cash the reward, where police discovered the extortionist was former Metropolitan Police Detective Sergeant Rodney Whitchelo.

Whitchelo was found guilty on six counts of blackmail, two counts each of contaminating food products and attempting to obtain property by deception, as well as one count of making a threat to kill, and was sentenced to 17 years of imprisonment.

== Rodney Whitchelo ==
Whitchelo was born in Hackney, London, in 1947. He attended Hackney Secondary Modern, before starting his first job with the Johnson Matthey chemical firm in Hatton Garden.

In 1976, Whitchelo enrolled in the Metropolitan Police, completing training at Hendon Police College. He became a qualified armed officer and later was promoted to Detective Sergeant.

In July 1986, Whitchelo was working in East London and attending a training school for detectives at the Derbyshire Constabulary. It was during this time that he heard a lecture on the emergence of a new type of terrorist, known as the "consumer terrorist." These individuals would target large companies, demanding ransom money that was significantly lower than the potential loss of profits resulting from consumers avoiding their products due to fears of tampering. The challenge for these extortionists lay in collecting the ransom money, as it necessitated their presence at a specific location and time to claim the funds. The lecturer noted that Whitchelo displayed an unusual interest in the subject matter during the lecture.

Whitchelo finished his policing career with the Criminal Investigation Department at Hackney. On the grounds of ill health and as a result of his asthma, Whitchelo took early retirement after 13 years with the Metropolitan Police. He left with a commendation for exemplary conduct. While working for the police, Whitchelo had started a side business as a computer firm, which had not been successful and resulted in some debt.

== Beginnings ==
=== Contaminated dog food and extortion letter sent to Pedigree Petfoods ===
In August 1988, Pedigree Petfoods received a package at their Leicestershire office containing a can of dog food and a letter that had been written on a typewriter. The letter started:

This is a demand of Pedigree Petfoods to pay £100,000 to prevent it’s [sic] products being contaminated with toxic substances.

The letter stated that the dog food that had accompanied the letter had been mixed with biocides, which were "colourless, odourless and highly toxic." Further, the author claimed that the chemicals were "virtually undetectable" by a pet owner and that "if payment is not forthcoming from Pedigree Petfoods or Mars Inc. [Pedigree's parent company], then large numbers of similarly contaminated tins will appear on retailers [sic] shelves throughout Great Britain."

Whitchelo pretended that he was a gang of blackmailers. He instructed Pedigree Petfoods to acknowledge his letter with a coded message for the gang in the personal column of The Daily Telegraph.

=== Initial police involvement ===
Pedigree Petfoods contacted the Leicestershire Police, who advised them to place the advert in the paper. The police added a telephone number, hoping that the blackmailers would contact them.

The first coded message said:

SANDRA HAPPY BIRTHDAY darling. Want to help, must talk, John.

=== The ransom money ===
In a reply letter, Whitchelo confirmed he had seen the message in the paper. Whitchelo's plan required Pedigree to dispense the ransom money to three different accounts, where the money could be collected at ATMs across the country. The account details were sent to a postal address in Hammersmith, London, where police discovered that the accounts, from Abbey National, Halifax and Nationwide, had been opened two years ago and were untraceable. The blackmailers had the ability to withdraw £300 each day.

The police only paid ransom money into the Halifax account, which limited Whitchelo to 900 withdrawal points across the country. Police were hopeful that if withdrawals were made in one particular area, they could conduct a more limited surveillance operation.

However, Whitchelo travelled to ATMs across the United Kingdom, including Wales and Scotland, to withdraw the funds. The act of putting the ransom into only the Halifax account frustrated Whitchelo, and at that point he decided to contaminate the dog food anyway.

=== Pet food contaminated ===
On 5 December 1988, after a number of hoax calls were made to police, Essex Police were told that contaminated Pedigree Chum dog food had been placed on the shelves at Savacentre Supermarket in Basildon. Intercepting some of the tins, forensic scientists discovered that they had been contaminated with salicylic acid.

Leicestershire Police asked Pedigree Petfoods to keep the situation a secret, as it was obvious which cans had been tampered with and therefore the public was not at risk. However, Whitchelo threatened to cause issues with Pedigree sales in a further letter, stating that the tactics of the "blackmailers" were changing, with razor blades being put into the tins, which would be immediately obvious to consumers.

=== Extortion letter to Heinz ===
On 22 March 1989, Whitchelo wrote a letter to the Heinz baby food company, based in London at that time. The letter demanded £100,000 from Heinz over five years, and threatened that if they did not deliver, Whitchelo would contaminate their baby food products with caustic soda.

== Operation Roach ==
In response, the Metropolitan Police launched Operation Roach. The investigation was headed up by the Regional Crime Squad at New Scotland Yard. An incident room was set up, headed by Detective Chief Superintendent, Pat Fleming, with Detective Chief Inspector, Gavin Robertson, as Fleming's deputy. The nationwide police investigation cost £3 million. The Metropolitan Police team were told that the same blackmail gang was responsible for the threats against both Pedigree Petfoods and Heinz.

=== Initial surveillance ===
Superintendent Fleming decided that surveillance was the only viable option. Three officers were assigned to each possible ATM: one officer monitored the computer to track the activity in the blackmailer's account, while the other two were tasked with intercepting the individual on-site. Given that Halifax had 900 available ATMs, it was estimated that 3,000 officers would be needed for the operation. However, it was believed that the blackmailers would not anticipate surveillance at every ATM. Yet, despite these efforts, on the night of April 27, 1989, the blackmailers did not make any withdrawals.

Police did not realize that Whitchelo was friends with officers on the operation, who inadvertently briefed him about the surveillance. In fact, Whitchelo had worked with Inspector Robertson in the past and even called Robertson in June 1989, while Operation Roach was ongoing.

A separate operation, Operation Stab, was set up around June 1989, to set surveillance on eight false addresses. These addresses had been set up by Whitchelo as dead-end leads.

Fleming later set up video surveillance at a few of the ATMs and on 23 December, a withdrawal was made from the blackmail account in Ipswich, Suffolk, 66.9 miles northeast of London. The footage showed a person dressed in a motorbike helmet, obscuring their face and leaving police unable to establish their identity.

=== The public discovers contaminated baby food ===
In Rayleigh, Essex, a Heinz customer found a printed label inside a jar of baby food that read "POISONED NAOH" (NaOH being the chemical symbol for sodium hydroxide) and disposed of the jar. In another incident, a nine-month-old baby was admitted to the hospital having eaten food laced with razor blade fragments. Officers discovered enough poison in another jar of Heinz's cauliflower baby food to kill 27 children.

As the surveillance continued unsuccessfully, Fleming and Robertson began to wonder whether there was a leak within the investigation team. At this stage, a total £14,000 of ransom money had been withdrawn. In order to get past the daily £300 withdrawal limit Whitchelo would use an ATM just before midnight, then shortly afterwards, enabling him to take £600 in one visit. The police decided that the banking computer system should be programmed to swallow the card whenever it was used next.

The next time Whitchelo used the card, the ATM swallowed it, but yielded no fingerprints, since Whitchelo always wore gloves. In response, Whitchelo wrote another letter:

We are the commercial terrorists who have been contaminating your products. We’re about to return with a vengeance. Next time, it will be potassium cyanide in your jars. Other Heinz products and tins will also be contaminated. If we’re prosecuted for murder, we might as well deserve it, but we’re confident we’ll never be caught. An infant’s death will be another statistic as far as we’re concerned.

Police decided to go public about the operation in order to warn consumers about the risk. In just one month, there were over 2,000 reported copycat false alarms. Heinz faced a massive slump in sales and offered a reward of £100,000 for information leading to the apprehension of the blackmailers. In April 1989, Heinz spent £32 million to replace their baby food containers with a tamper-proof design.

John Hinch, managing director of Heinz, received a letter which offered information about the blackmail in exchange for the reward money. The author was aware that police had been watching the ATMs and knew the codenames that the writer of the original letters had used ("Romeo" and "Juliet"). The original letters were typed, but this letter was stenciled. The author requested payment through building society accounts. This led Fleming to believe that the author was a blackmailer, as opposed to a real informant.

Fleming's hunch was correct; Whitchelo had written the letter. Using two other bank accounts under the names Ian and Nina Fox, Whitchelo planned to claim the reward money.

== Operation Agincourt ==
Fleming and Robertson wanted to give their team the impression that Operation Roach was slowing down while commencing another, confidential mission called "Operation Agincourt." Two officers from the previous team were transferred, with instructions to keep their involvement secret. Fleming sent payments to the Ian and Nina Fox accounts and noted that the person withdrawing the money was doing so more locally, with the majority of withdrawals occurring within the east London area.

Surveillance was planned for October 20 and 21. The team decided to focus on the Woolwich area of London, choosing 15 ATMs to stakeout. Officers from Special Branch were brought in to assist with the surveillance.

However, just before the stakeout, a workman accidentally cut through an electrical cable servicing the Woolwich mainframe computer, preventing police from knowing when a particular account was being accessed. Although this was a setback, the operation had already been set up and Fleming decided to proceed with it.

Whitchelo attempted to use an ATM in Uxbridge, which was not under surveillance. Due to the workman's accident, the ATM was out of order. At 12:30 AM in Enfield, Middlesex, officers noticed a person in a motorbike helmet getting out of a car, matching the description they had been given. Officers exited their vehicle and followed the suspect (Whitchelo) to an ATM, but this one was also out of order. Whitchelo returned to his vehicle, where the officers approached and searched him. Asked why he was wearing a crash helmet, Whitchelo replied that it stopped him from getting wet. Officers found a bank card in the name of Ian and Nina Fox on Whitchelo's person. Whitchelo was arrested in connection with blackmail and threats to kill. In total, he had withdrawn £34,000 since the beginning of his scheme.

== Trial and aftermath ==
On 23 October 1989, Whitchelo appeared at Westminster Magistrates' court. The charges were as follows: "conspiring with a person or persons unknown that between August 1988 and October this year [1989], with a view to gain for himself, [Whitchelo] made an unwarranted demand for £1.25m on H.J. Heinz and Company." Whichelo was remanded into custody for one week, scheduled to return to court on 20 November 1989.

Police discovered that Whitchelo often called his mother and friends on his mobile phone as he travelled. These times and locations were cross-referenced with the ransom withdrawals, showing numerous matches.

Whitchelo's trial was held at the Old Bailey, in front of Judge Nina Lowry. Throughout his trial, Whitchelo claimed that he had been set up by other police officers. On 17 December 1990, Whitchelo was found guilty of six counts of blackmail, two counts each of contaminating food products and attempting to obtain property by deception, as well as one count of making a threat to kill. Whitchelo was sentenced to 17 years of imprisonment.

In August 1998, Whitchelo was released, having spent nine years in prison. Speaking to the Sunday Mirror, Whitchelo said that he believed he had atoned for his crimes and apologised for his actions.

== See also ==
- Tesco blackmail plot - extortion attempt against British supermarket chain Tesco, where an extortionist threatened to contaminate baby food with salmonella, white powder and knives.
- 2007 Tesco blackmail campaign - an extortion attempt against Tesco in 2007, where an extortionist threatened to put caustic soda in yoghurt sold in the store.
- Tesco bomb campaign - an attempted extortion against Tesco in August 2000.
- Edgar Pearce
