= Underrepresented group =

Population subset

An underrepresented group describes a subset of a population that holds a smaller percentage within a significant subgroup than the subset holds in the general population. Specific characteristics of an underrepresented group vary depending on the subgroup being considered.

== Underrepresented groups in STEM ==
=== United States ===
Underrepresented groups in science, technology, engineering, and mathematics in the United States include women and some minorities. In the United States, women made up 50% of the college-educated workers in 2010, but only 28% of the science and engineering workers. Other underrepresented groups in science and engineering included African Americans, Native Americans, Alaskan Natives, and Hispanics, who collectively formed 26% of the population, but accounted for only 10% of the science and engineering workers. This 2015 study found that women make up just 26% of the computing workforce and 12% of the engineering workforce; African American, Hispanic, and Native American women are especially underrepresented in these industries. (McBride & McBride, 2018).

Underrepresented groups in computing, a subset of the STEM fields, include Hispanics, and African-Americans. In the United States in 2015, Hispanics were 15% of the population and African-Americans were 13%, but their representation in the workforces of major tech companies in technical positions typically runs less than 5% and 3%, respectively. Similarly, women, providing approximately 50% of the general population, typically comprise less than 20% of the technology and leadership positions in the major technology companies. When it comes to the engineering and computing workforce, which accounts for more than 80% of STEM jobs, women remain dramatically underrepresented, as documented in the American Association of University Women's (AAUW) recent research report Solving the Equation: The Variables for Women's Success in Engineering and Computing (McBride & McBride, 2018). Women were underrepresented as external seminar program speakers and on decision-making committees for faculty promotions, institutional strategy, and graduate student appointment or recruitment. In addition, most institutions did not have policies that promote gender diversity on committees or to encourage women-friendly workplaces. (Beeler, et al., 2019). Women in STEM are more likely to be assigned jobs where there is less recognition compared to men. Surveys show that women spent more hours per week teaching and fewer hours conducting research than men. This meant women had little opportunity for promotions.

=== Japan ===
In Japan, the ratio of participation of women in the STEM field is very low. According to the survey in 2013, while almost all countries in OECD have about 20% to 40% of women researchers, Japan has 14.6%, which is a relatively low ratio. The ratio of women researchers is the lowest among countries in OECD in every area, including the industry, government, and universities, especially in the industrial areas, where only 8.1% of researchers are women. Although the ratio is slightly increasing, the speed of this increase is relatively low compared to the other countries.

== Underrepresented groups in other countries ==
=== Canada ===
In Canada, the Employment Equity Act labels four designated groups: Women, Aboriginal Peoples (now an obsolete term), Persons with Disabilities and Members of Visible Minorities (who are not Aboriginal, non-Caucasian in race or non-white in colour).

== See also ==
- America COMPETES Act
- Civic engagement
- Computing Research Association
- Diversity in Library Science
- Labor and Worklife Program
- Minority Group
- National Center for Women & Information Technology
- Social representation
- STEM pipeline
- Systemic bias
- Women in Data (UK)
