= 1998 Vail arson attacks =

Colorado ecotage

On the morning of October 19, 1998, a group of Earth Liberation Front activists set fire to several lifts and buildings at Vail Ski Resort. This was one of the most serious ecotage attacks in the history of the United States, causing $12 million in damages, which caught the attention of the nation. The fires were set at Two Elk Lodge, and destroyed multiple buildings on Vail Mountain, including Two Elk Restaurant. In 2006, Chelsea Dawn Gerlach and Stanislas Gregory Meyerhoff both pleaded guilty to the attacks.

In August 2018, suspect Joseph Dibee, on the run for 12 years, was en route to Russia when he was apprehended in Cuba, then returned to the United States. Josephine Sunshine Overaker, believed to have fled to Europe in 2001, remains at large and is wanted by the FBI.

== Timeline of Events ==
=== October 18, 1998 ===
- Evening (Approximately 6:00 PM – 10:00 PM)
  - Members of the Earth Liberation Front (ELF) finalize plans to target Vail Ski Resort facilities.
  - The group gathers materials for incendiary devices, including gasoline, diesel fuel, and timing mechanisms.
  - Arsonists conduct final reconnaissance of target sites to ensure no civilians will be present.
- Late Night (Approximately 10:00 PM – 12:00 AM)
  - The group assembles incendiary devices using milk jugs filled with fuel mixtures.
  - Timing devices are prepared, often utilizing incense sticks as fuses to delay ignition.
  - Arsonists begin moving towards designated target locations on Vail Mountain.

=== October 19, 1998 ===
- Early Morning Hours (Approximately 12:00 AM – 2:00 AM)
  - Arsonists arrive at various sites, including:
    - Two Elk Lodge (a 12,000-square-foot mountaintop restaurant)
    - Ski Patrol Headquarters
    - Four lift terminals (including the Eagle Bahn Gondola and the Pride Express Lift)
  - Incendiary devices are strategically placed inside or near the structures.
- Approximately 2:00 AM – 3:00 AM
  - Timing mechanisms are activated to ensure a delayed ignition.
  - Arsonists depart the area, using predetermined escape routes to avoid detection.
  - Any physical evidence, such as fingerprints or footprints, is minimized.
- Approximately 3:00 AM – 4:00 AM
  - Incendiary devices ignite, and fires begin to consume the targeted structures.
  - Due to accelerants, the fires spread rapidly, engulfing buildings within minutes.
  - Remote locations and the timing of the fires reduce the likelihood of immediate detection.
- Approximately 4:00 AM
  - Smoke and flames become visible from a distance.
  - Early morning workers and nearby residents notice the fires and alert authorities.
  - Emergency services receive multiple reports of fires on Vail Mountain.
- Approximately 4:30 AM – 5:00 AM
  - Firefighters from Vail and surrounding areas are dispatched to the scene.
  - Access to the burning structures is hindered by the mountainous terrain and lack of roads.
  - Initial efforts focus on assessing the scope of the fires and planning containment strategies.
- Approximately 5:00 AM – 7:00 AM
  - Firefighters combat the blazes, but efforts are hampered by limited water sources and difficult access.
  - The Two Elk Lodge and other structures suffer extensive damage or are completely destroyed.
  - Authorities begin to suspect arson due to the simultaneous nature of the fires.
- Approximately 7:00 AM – 8:00 AM
  - News of the fires spreads throughout the local community.
  - Vail Resorts officials arrive to assess the damage and support firefighting efforts.
  - The financial impact is preliminarily estimated to be around $12 million.
- Approximately 8:00 AM – 10:00 AM
  - Investigators from local law enforcement and the FBI arrive on the scene.
  - Evidence of incendiary devices is discovered, confirming suspicions of arson.
  - The area is secured for a detailed forensic investigation.
- Approximately 10:00 AM – 12:00 PM
  - The Earth Liberation Front (ELF) sends an anonymous communiqué to local media outlets claiming responsibility.
    - The message states: "On behalf of the lynx, five buildings and four ski lifts at Vail were reduced to ashes. Vail Inc. is already the largest ski operation in North America and now wants to expand even further. If there isn't room for wildlife, then there isn't room for people."
  - The communiqué brings national attention to the incident, framing it as an act of eco-terrorism.
- Afternoon (Approximately 12:00 PM – 5:00 PM)
  - Press conferences are held by law enforcement and Vail Resorts addressing the incident.
  - The FBI classifies the attack as an act of domestic terrorism.
  - A reward is offered for information leading to the arrest of those responsible.
  - Environmental groups publicly condemn the arson, distancing themselves from extremist actions.
- Evening (Approximately 5:00 PM – 8:00 PM)
  - Firefighters achieve full containment of the fires.
  - Investigations continue into the night, with authorities collecting evidence and interviewing potential witnesses.
  - Media coverage intensifies, highlighting the environmental motivations cited by the ELF.
