= 2007 Tesco blackmail campaign =

Extortion attempt against Tesco supermarkets

- Date: May 2007 – July 2007
- Charges: Blackmail, three counts; communicating a bomb hoax, two counts
- Convictions: Phil McHugh

The 2007 Tesco blackmail campaign was an extortion attempt against the British supermarket chain Tesco.

== May threats ==
In May 2007, a series of letters threatening to contaminate food in Tesco stores were sent to the company's offices in Dundee. The blackmailer asked for £100,000. This did not succeed so the blackmailer demanded executives transfer £200,000 into his bank account or he would put caustic soda in yoghurt sold in the store.

The letters were signed "Arbuthnot, the sign is the spider" and had dead spiders taped to them. Some of them had text composed of letters cut out of a magazine and demanded that Tesco respond via an advertisement in the personal column in The Times. Tesco did not respond.

== July threats ==
In July, hoax bomb warnings were sent to 76 Tesco supermarkets. They warned that bombs would go off on Saturday, 14 July or "Black Saturday".

14 Tesco branches closed, including those in Clitheroe, Grimsby, Pontefract, Market Harborough, Ashby de la Zouch, Bury St Edmunds, Hucknall, Hereford, Ledbury and Glasgow. The closures cost Tesco £1.4 million.

After the threats the letter writer wrote to Tesco executives again demanding £200 a day and an overall figure of £1 million, which would have taken the blackmailer 13 years to amass the total amount.

== Arrest and trial ==
Police decided to lure the blackmailer into giving away their identity by transferring money into a bank account as demanded.

On four consecutive dates in July 2007, the suspect withdrew money from cashpoints in Blackburn, Bolton, Burnley and Carlisle. Although he concealed his face, he wore distinctive Wellington boots that helped police track him on CCTV. On 23 July 2007, the suspect, Phil McHugh, was arrested in his home on Milton Avenue, Clitheroe. McHugh was a former tax inspector and unemployed charity worker who had gambling debts of £37,000. McHugh pleaded guilty to three specimen charges of blackmail and two charges of communicating a bomb hoax and in January 2008 he was sentenced to six years imprisonment.

== See also ==
- Tesco blackmail plot
- Tesco bomb campaign
- Pedigree Chum dog food and Heinz extortion campaign
