= Tesco blackmail plot =

Extortion attempt against British supermarket chain

- Date: May 2018 – February 2020
- Charges: Blackmail, four counts; contaminating food, two counts
- Convictions: Nigel Wright

The Tesco blackmail plot was an extortion attempt against the British supermarket chain Tesco and which led to the largest blackmail investigation in the UK.

Nigel Wright, 45, from Lincolnshire was sentenced at the Central Criminal Court of England and Wales for blackmail after he plotted to extort £1.4 million from the supermarket company.

== Threats ==
A series of letters and emails were sent to Tesco, threatening to contaminate baby food with salmonella, white powder and knives. They demanded £1.4 million in bitcoin and used aliases such as "Guy Brush" and "The Dairy Pirates". They claimed to be from a group of farmers angry at the low price of milk.

== Contaminated food found ==
In Lockerbie Morven Smith had already fed a few spoonfuls of Heinz sweet and sour chicken to her ten month old baby when she found a metal fragment in the bowl and removed it. This was in December 2019.

In Rochdale Harpreet Kaur-Singh had binned a jar of Heinz Sunday chicken dinner and a jar of cheesy pasta stars after discovering metal while feeding her nine month old daughter.

== Impact ==
Tesco was forced to issue a product recall of 42,000 jars after the contaminated jars were found in Lockerbie and Rochdale.

== Investigation ==
The investigation started in Humberside where the first letters were received before being passed to Bedfordshire, Cambridgeshire and Hertfordshire Major Crime Units to investigate with the help of the National Crime Agency. It was the largest blackmail investigation in the UK, at times involving more than 100 officers with 30 officers watching CCTV around the clock.

The Food Standards Agency, Food Standards Scotland, Public Health England, Public Health Scotland and Police Scotland were also involved.

Nigel Wright was spotted on CCTV from a Tesco in Lockerbie putting a tampered jar of baby food on a shelf before buying a bottle of wine, flowers for his wife and more baby food.

== Arrest ==
On 25 February 2020 Nigel Wright was arrested at his family home outside Market Rasen in Lincolnshire. Police found photos of contaminated baby food on his laptop with jars identical to those found in Rochdale. They also found draft blackmail notes on his laptop.

== Suspect ==
Nigel Wright was a sheep farmer and had been the youngest ever chairman of the Great Grimsby Conservative association at the age of 29. He had won an election to the Freshney Ward of North East Lincolnshire Council in 2003. In 2010 he joined UKIP.

== Trial ==
Wright admitted to planting a tampered jar in Lockerbie but denied planting them in Rochdale. He claimed he was forced to do it because his family were threatened by Travellers.

Both Morven Smith and Harpreet Kaur-Singh testified about the metal they had found in their children's food.

Julian Christopher QC, the prosecutor, said "The truth is you were not in fear at all. You were carrying on your life normally while hoping to make yourself rich by threatening Tesco in this way while endangering the life of others in the process.".

=== Conviction ===
Nigel Wright was convicted of three charges of blackmail, two charges of contaminating food and a further charge of blackmail for demanding £150,000 worth of bitcoin from a driver with whom he had a road-rage altercation.

Bill Jephson, the assistant chief constable in charge of the investigation for Hertfordshire police described it as "most serious and most challenging” product contamination case ever dealt with in the UK".

Lucy Thompson, the deputy senior investigating officer said that there was no evidence to support Wright's claims that Travellers had threatened Wright and his family to force him to carry out the plot.

=== Sentencing ===
Sentencing was scheduled for 28 September 2020. Mr Justice Warby also asked for psychiatric reports on Wright to be prepared and warned Wright to be prepared for a "lengthy custodial sentence".

In October 2020 Nigel Wright was sentenced to 14 years: 11 years for the plot against Tesco and 3 years to run consecutively for the road rage blackmail conviction. Detective Inspector Lucy Thompson said "Wright is a dangerous offender who gave no thought to the babies he could have harmed during his callous pursuit of money."

== See also ==
- 2007 Tesco blackmail campaign
- Tesco bomb campaign
- Pedigree Chum dog food and Heinz extortion campaign
