= The Female Lead =

Educational charity

The Female Lead is an educational charity launched in 2015. It is dedicated to increasing the visibility of women's success stories in all walks of life and offering girls a wider selection of role models than those represented in popular culture.

== History ==
The Female Lead launched on International Women's Day in 2015. It was founded by data science entrepreneur Edwina Dunn.

The Female Lead Book was published by Ebury Press in February 2017. Within its 250 pages it profiles 60 women of all ages and professional backgrounds, including Meryl Streep, Christine Lagarde, Leymah Gbowee, Ava DuVernay, Lena Dunham, Karlie Kloss, Jo Malone MBE and Dame Athene Donald. Portrait photography was provided by French photographer Brigitte Lacombe, and interviews were conducted by journalists Geraldine Bedell, Rosanna Greenstreet and Hester Lacey. Alongside the book, video interviews with each woman were made by film-maker Marian Lacombe, Brigitte's Lacombe's sister.

The book features women including politicians and artists, journalists and teachers, engineers and campaigners, firefighters and film stars. Each was chosen for their inspiring story.

On 8 February 2017, the book, its accompanying documentary by Marian Lacombe and teaching resource, were launched at The Imax Theatre of London's Science Museum.

The Female Lead is donating 18,000 copies of the book to schools, colleges and universities in the UK and USA.

== Work ==
In addition to the book, The Female Lead conducts a programme of schools’ outreach. The programme speaks to secondary schools and university students about role models and career aspirations. In 2018, it also began a research project, led by Dr Terri Apter, to discover the impact of role models on young women's aspirations. The research launched in October 2019 encouraging young girls to follow positive role models.

== Activities ==
The Female Lead hosts events and workshops showcasing female role models to women and girls in their network. In March 2019, The Female Lead partnered with Disney for the UK premiere of the movie Captain Marvel. It surprised a young Marvel super-fan, Illie, with tickets to the premiere and the chance to conduct red carpet interviews with stars of the film including Brie Larson and Samuel L Jackson.

In 2017 and 2018, The Female Lead partnered with Women in Data UK (WiD UK) to launch "20 in Data & Technology", an initiative designed to showcase outstanding stories of female achievement in data and technology across the UK.

== Awards and nominations ==
In 2018, Edwina Dunn, through The Female Lead, was awarded the ‘Women’s Empowerment Award’ by Fashion 4 Development, and the Evening Standard Changemaker Award.

In 2019, The Female Lead was shortlisted for the National Diversity Awards.
