= Norlington School =

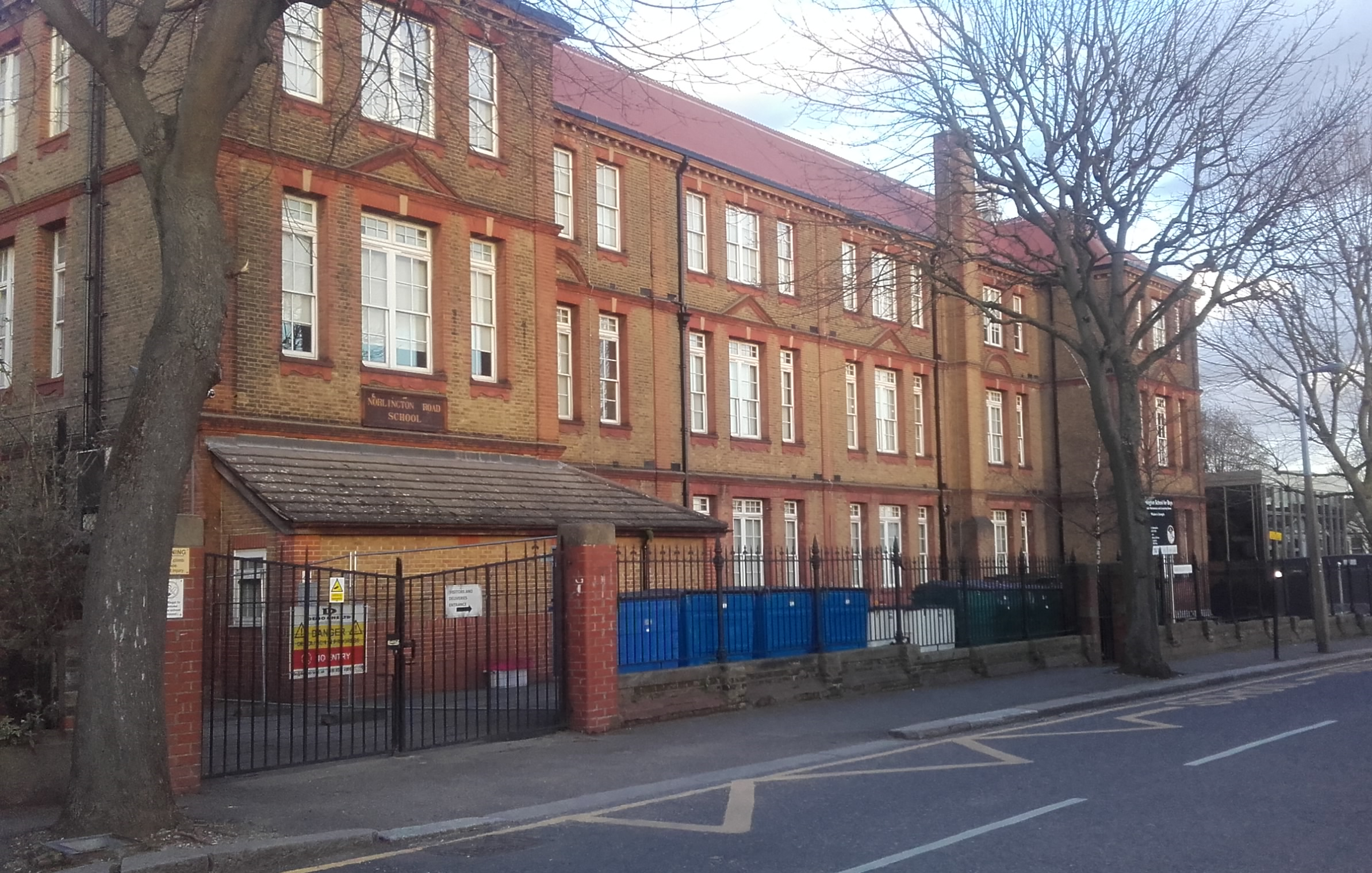

Location
- Norlington Road; Leyton; London, E10 6JZ; England
- Coordinates: 51.56666°N 0.00134°W

Information
- Type: Academy
- Motto: Wisdom is Strength
- Established: 1902
- Local authority: Waltham Forest
- Trust: The Exceptional Education Trust
- Department for Education URN: 143385 Tables
- Ofsted: Reports
- Principal: Juan Hernandez
- Gender: Boys
- Age: 11 to 18
- Enrolment: 600
- Website: www.norlington.net

Norlington School is a boys' secondary school and coeducational sixth form located in the London Borough of Waltham Forest, in East London. The school is situated on Norlington Road in Leyton.

== History ==
Norlington Road Council School was initially an elementary school for boys, girls, and infants, which opened in 1903. In 1932 it was reorganized for senior girls, junior girls, and infants. In 1940 the school was badly damaged by German bombs during the Blitz.

The junior department became mixed in 1942. In 1948 the school became a secondary modern school for boys. An extension was completed in 1964 to provide science labs and woodwork and metalwork rooms. In 1968, Waltham Forest adopted the Comprehensive system and it became Norlington Junior High School for Boys, catering for 11- to 14-year-olds.

Following a Borough-wide reorganisation in the early 1980s, it adopted its current name and function.

In September 2015, the school opened a mixed-sex sixth form, offering 10 A-level subjects including science, technology and mathematics.

Previously a community school administered by Waltham Forest London Borough Council, in September 2016 Norlington School converted to academy status. The school is now sponsored by The Exceptional Education Trust.

== Notable former pupils ==
- Jonathan Ross, television presenter
- Paul Ross, television presenter
- Graham Gooch, former England cricketer
- Paul Hayes, professional footballer
- Paul Davis (programmer), founding programmer at Amazon.com
- Vic Groves Arsenal Footballer 1950s
- Keith Darvill Member of Parliament for Upminster, 1997-2001
- Edgar Pearce, extortionist and bomber
