= Tesco Clubcard =

British supermarket loyalty card

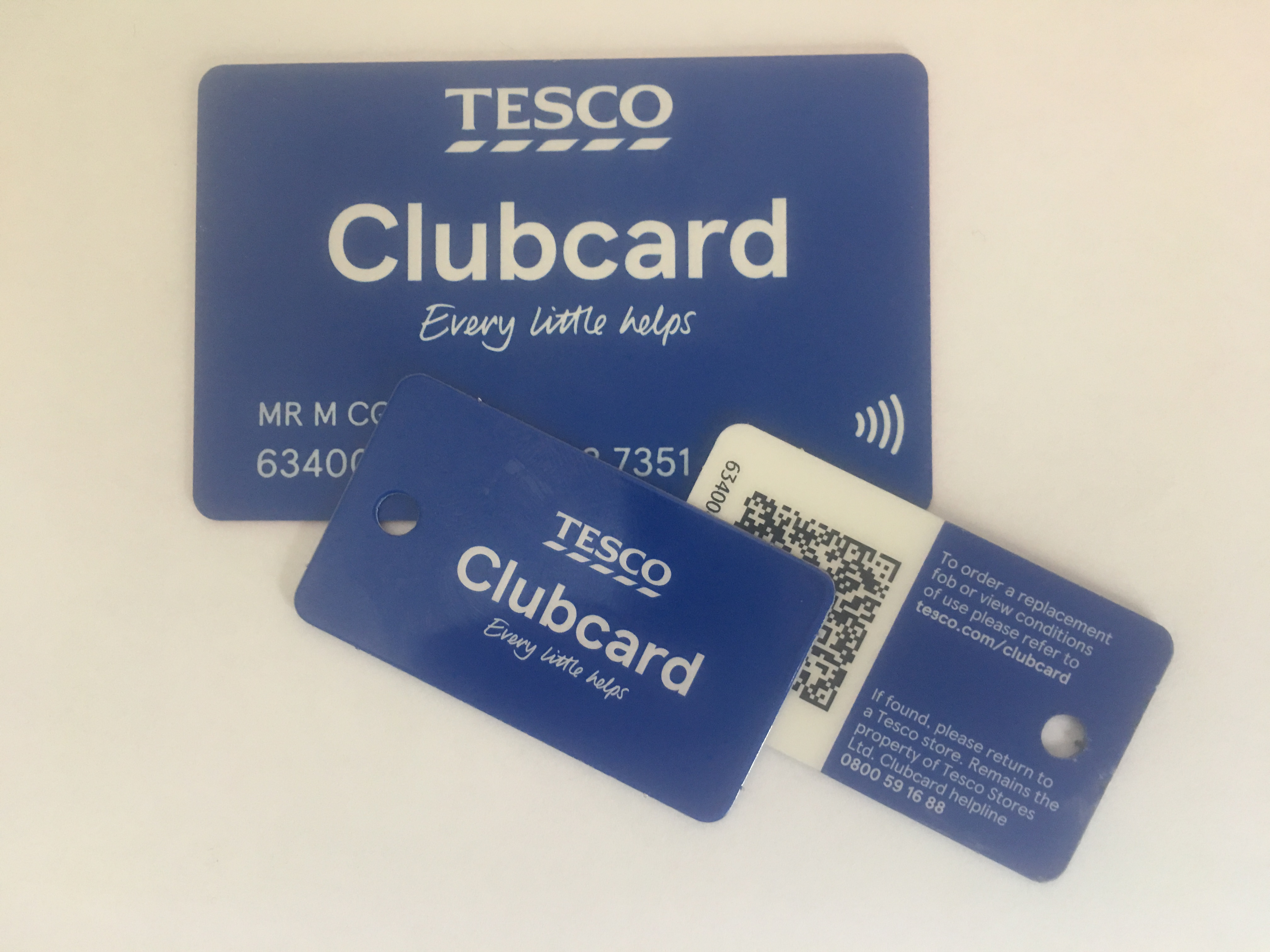
- A 2017 Tesco Clubcard containing contactless technology and the accompanying keyfobs
- Type: Loyalty card
- Run by: Dunnhumby
- Owner: Tesco
- Area served: United Kingdom
- Introduced: 13 February 1995; 31 years ago
- Number of users: 20 million (2021, UK only)
- Tagline: The power to lower prices.
- Website: tesco.com/clubcard

Tesco Clubcard (commonly referred to and branded as Clubcard) is the loyalty card of British supermarket chain Tesco. It was introduced to Tesco customers in 1995, where it has since gained over 20 million users as of 2021. The card works on a point-based system, where holders receive points based on money spent. The number of points earned depends on what type of item is bought, and from where.

The Clubcard scheme operates in the United Kingdom, Ireland, Czech Republic, Slovakia, Hungary and several other countries, although its primary userbase is in the United Kingdom, where it first released.

== History ==
In 1993, Terry Leahy asked the Tesco marketing team to investigate the potential of loyalty cards. In the past Tesco had run Green Shield Stamps as a promotional tool which rewarded people for visits and spending, but gained no customer information. The initial team researched programmes across the world and developed a proposal which showed that a loyalty card could be very effective. The key change since the days of Green Shield Stamps was the ability to track individual customer behaviour cost-effectively using a magnetic stripe card.

In 1994, Grant Harrison attended a conference where Clive Humby from marketing firm dunnhumby was speaking. Dunnhumby was already working with clients such as Cable & Wireless and BMW, and Harrison approached them to help with the loyalty card project. Successful trials throughout 1994 led to the Tesco board asking Harrison and Humby to present to the annual Board strategy session.

The first response from the board came from Tesco's then-chairman Lord MacLaurin, who said, "What scares me about this is that you know more about my customers after three months than I know after 30 years."

=== Incidents ===
In January 1995, Frank Riolfo, a former lance-corporal of the Royal Army Medical Corps, extorted Tesco, forcing the introduction of the previously trialled discount card. After first contaminating food with (what turned out to be fake) HIV-infected blood in a store in Kettering, Riolfo demanded payment via Tesco's new loyalty card system.

He specified that the cards were to contain magnetic strips, allowing them to function secretly as ATM cash withdrawal cards. Coded copies of the PIN code were published under his instruction in national newspapers. Clubcard was subsequently launched nationally with a Direct Marketing campaign by Evans Hunt Scott, Terry Hunt's advertising agency.

Customers, including Riolfo's wife, signed up to the scheme and collected a card. Riolfo and his wife then toured the country withdrawing a total of £7,500 cash on 73 occasions until they were eventually caught on 22 April 1995. Frank Riolfo pleaded guilty and was jailed for six years, after appeal. The loyalty card scheme was not discontinued, with Tesco already planning to roll out the trial before the incident.

In the end of 2000, Robert Edward Dyer made a similar attempt at extortion involving Clubcards with a magnetic strip for ATM withdrawals. Dyer sent several letter bombs, one of which exploded when the recipient opened it, before being arrested in February 2001.

After two slight amendments to the design of cards in the 1990s by Evans Hunt Scott's creative team, the scheme had a major relaunch in 2005 with all members being sent personalised cards and key fobs which could be scanned at the checkout, rather than swiped. The scheme was again relaunched in 2008 with all seven million members once again being sent new design cards and key fobs. A further redesign in 2017 allowed contactless technology to be embedded in the cards and key fobs.

=== Abroad ===
The Tesco Clubcard scheme was introduced into the Republic of Ireland almost immediately after Tesco's acquisition of Power Supermarkets Limited (now Tesco Ireland), and operates in similar fashion. It was originally an extension of the scheme in the United Kingdom, not a separate scheme, so Irish Clubcards could be used in stores in the United Kingdom until 2019.

In 2007, Tesco Clubcard was first introduced in all Tesco Extra stores in Malaysia and later in all store formats. In Malaysia, every two Ringgit spent earn 1 Clubcard point. By 2014 the scheme had 1.7m cardholders.

The Tesco Clubcard scheme was introduced into Polish Tesco Stores in 2008, and Slovakia at the end of 2009. As of September 2010, these markets had 1.5m and 850,000 cardholders respectively. Though operating in a similar fashion to the scheme in the United Kingdom, it is independent, so Clubcards from other countries cannot be used in Slovak or Polish stores. In Slovakia every €1 spent gives 1 Clubcard point (or one point per litre of petrol). Clubcard was launched in the Czech Republic and Hungary in 2010.

== Benefits ==
When shopping at Tesco or using Tesco services (such as services from Tesco Bank), Clubcard holders receive points based on the amount spent. For shopping at Tesco they receive one point for every £1 (one point for every €1 in Ireland) they spend, but for most other services, including fuel, one point is awarded for every £2 (€2 in Ireland) spent. Points are accrued and at least four times a year (there are sometimes "surprise mailings") the holder receives a statement and vouchers to the value of points they have saved. (They have to have saved at least 150 points, with a value of £1.50, to receive a voucher.)

Vouchers can be spent in store on shopping or online on grocery home shopping, or used on Clubcard Rewards where they can be worth three times their face value on selected Rewards in the United Kingdom and up to four times their face value in Ireland. These can be used to obtain discounted day trips, magazines, hotel breaks, restaurant tokens and other offers. Holders are also eligible for Clubcard Prices, immediate discounts for both in-store and online purchases.

As part of the Clubcard 2 launch, it was announced that, from 17 August 2009, all instore and online purchases would attract double points (2 points per £1). Reports indicate that this initiative was successful in increasing the number of active cardholders from 14 million to 15 million in the market year 2009/10. However, this reverted to 1 point for £1 spent at the end of 2011.

Tesco Bank credit cards originally acted also as Clubcards, collecting points from purchases in Tesco stores and online. From May 2010, however, they also collected one additional point for every £4 spent on credit card purchases from any Tesco outlet and one point for every £8 spent outside of Tesco.

If one scans their Clubcard, they can also receive discounts on various items.

=== Collecting Clubcard Points at Esso ===
In 2012, Esso launched a nationwide partnership with Tesco that allows Tesco Clubcard holders to collect Clubcard points from Esso fuel stations across the UK. Clubcard holders can collect points on fuel purchases as well as some shop purchases on Esso fuelling stations. Since 2017, Esso was the exclusive Tesco Clubcard point earn partner outside of Tesco. On 1 June 2019, Tesco ended its partnership with Esso meaning points can now only be collected when there is an attached Tesco Express Store at the Esso fuel station.

=== Online Clubcard Boost ===
Customers can 'boost' their Clubcard vouchers to use for days out, restaurants and holidays by going to the Clubcard website. The range of partners changes sporadically, but usually customers are able to exchange their vouchers for two times their value (prior to July 2023, three times their value).

=== Collecting points ===
Clubcard points can be accumulated by spending money in the following places:

- Tesco stores
- Tesco.com
- Tesco Bank
- Tesco Fuel stations
  - Joint Esso & Tesco fuelling stations
- Tesco Mobile
  - Tesco International Calling
- Tesco Opticians
- Tesco Photo
- Tesco Views
- Tesco Wine
- F&F
- Shopper Thoughts

== Former benefits ==
=== Former partners ===
Formerly cardholders could earn Clubcard points at the following places, although this has since ceased:

- AVIS, earning points ended 1 February 2009
- E.ON UK, ended 2017
- Marriott Hotels, earning points ended 1 April 2008
- National Tyres
- Esso (Except Essos with a Tesco Express)

=== Clubcard TV ===
Tesco announced in February 2013 that it will be launching its own TV and film on-demand service. The service would be free to Tesco Clubcard members, with no charges, subscription or contract. On 28 October 2014, the short lived Clubcard TV was closed.

== Privacy concerns ==
Some Clubcard users have concerns about the information Tesco and Dunnhumby hold and what they do with it. Details of each Clubcard transaction, such as the store, products purchased, and price paid, are stored for up to two years. Applicants are asked to provide personal details such as name, address, and whether they have children. Tesco says this helps them pick vouchers that are relevant to the holder and to monitor trends to help product availability.

== Mobile phone applications ==
Starting in the end of 2010, Tesco launched applications for iPhone, BlackBerry, Android and Nokia Ovi, so points can be collected by presenting a barcode on the handset instead of a keyfob or card. This application was relatively simple on launch, offering little more than a barcode, but updates have increased functionality to include features such as the ability to view current offers instore. On 10 July 2017, Tesco released the Clubcard application on the Google Play store.
