= Rodney Whitchelo =

Convicted British law enforcement officer and extortionist

Rodney Whitchelo (born 1947) is a British law enforcement officer and criminal convicted of blackmail and food contamination. He poisoned baby products as part of a plot to extort Heinz, causing a baby food scare in 1989. Whitchelo, who was dubbed the "consumer terrorist", committed his crimes while serving as a detective of the Scotland Yard.

== Biography ==
Whitchelo was born in 1947 in Hackney, London. He went to Hackney Secondary Modern and was noted for his aptitude as a student. His first job was with the chemical firm Johnson Matthey. He later secured employment in a small marketing company in Greenwich. By 1976, Whitchelo got bored with his line of work so he enrolled at Hendon Police College. After completing his training, he became an arms officer and was eventually promoted to a detective sergeant position. He then joined Scotland Yard's regional crime squad.

While still in law enforcement, Whitchelo set up his own computer company which failed and plunged him into debt. In 1988, he retired from service citing health concerns. In the same year, however, while he was still working for Scotland Yard and desperate for money, Whitchelo hatched a plot to extort money from big companies. This came after he attended lectures on consumer terrorism and corporate blackmail.

The plot involved spiking products of food giants Heinz and Pedigree with sodium hydroxide used in bleach products and broken up razor blades. He demanded approximately £4 million from these companies as part of his extortion scheme. It was learned that he purchased jars of baby food and returned them to store shelves. When authorities examined one of these, they found it contained poison that could have killed 27 children. Heinz was forced to withdraw baby food from store shelves amounting to £30 million in lost revenue.

Whitchelo then used his experience to keep ahead of the authorities investigating his extortion scheme. Eventually he turned his attention to the reward money offered for information about the perpetrator. He contacted the officers investigating the case to claim the £100,000 reward in exchange for information about the food contamination. He was caught withdrawing the money offered from a cashpoint. When he was arrested he initially blamed fellow police officers, claiming that they framed him. In 1990, he was sentenced to 17 years imprisonment. Whitchelo was released eight years early.
