= CCG =

CCG may refer to:

== Coast guards ==
- Canadian Coast Guard
- China Coast Guard

== Companies ==
- Chemical Computing Group, a Canadian pharmaceutical software company

== Entertainment ==
- Collectible card game
- Command & Conquer: Generals, a 2003 video game
- Community-controlled game, a video game genre

== Electronics ==
- Copper Control Gear (CCG), a type of Electrical ballast Switch Start for lighting, alternative to ECG (Electronic Control Gear) Electronic.

== Other ==
- Castor Cracking Group, a demo (computer art) group
- CCG, a codon for the amino acid proline
- Center for China and Globalization, a think tank in China
- Centre for Computational Geography, University of Leeds, England
- Children's Cancer Study Group, conducted cancer research
- Churchgate railway station (Indian Railways station code: CCG), Mumbai, India
- Climate Compatible Growth, a research-based programme funded by the United Kingdom Foreign, Commonwealth and Development Office
- Clinical commissioning group, commissioners of many health services in England
- Combinatory categorial grammar, a grammar formalism
- Commission of Counter Ghoul, a fictional organization in the manga series Tokyo Ghoul
- Computational Chemistry Grid
- Conference championship games, championship games for conferences in sports leagues
- Country commercial guides, reports from the United States Commercial Service
- County Cricket Ground (disambiguation)
- Cross-correlogram, a statistical plotting technique
