= Population geography =

Branch of human geography

Satellite image of Earth at night

Population geography is the study of the distribution, composition, migration, and growth of human populations in relation to the geographic characteristics of specific area. It focuses on how populations are distributed across space, the factors influencing these distributions, and the implications for resources, environment, and societal development. This branch of geography integrates demographic data with spatial analysis to understand patterns such as population density, urbanization, and migration trends. Population geography involves demography in a geographical perspective. (Note: While population geography focuses on the impacts of population on spatial structures and processes, geodemography analyzes the effects of space on demographic structures and processes. However, the boundary between population geography and demography is becoming more and more blurred.) It focuses on the characteristics of population distributions that change in a spatial context. This often involves factors such as where population is found and how the size and composition of these population is regulated by the demographic processes of fertility, mortality, and migration.

Contributions to population geography are cross-disciplinary because geographical epistemologies related to environment, place and space have been developed at various times. Related disciplines include geography, demography, sociology, and economics.

== History ==
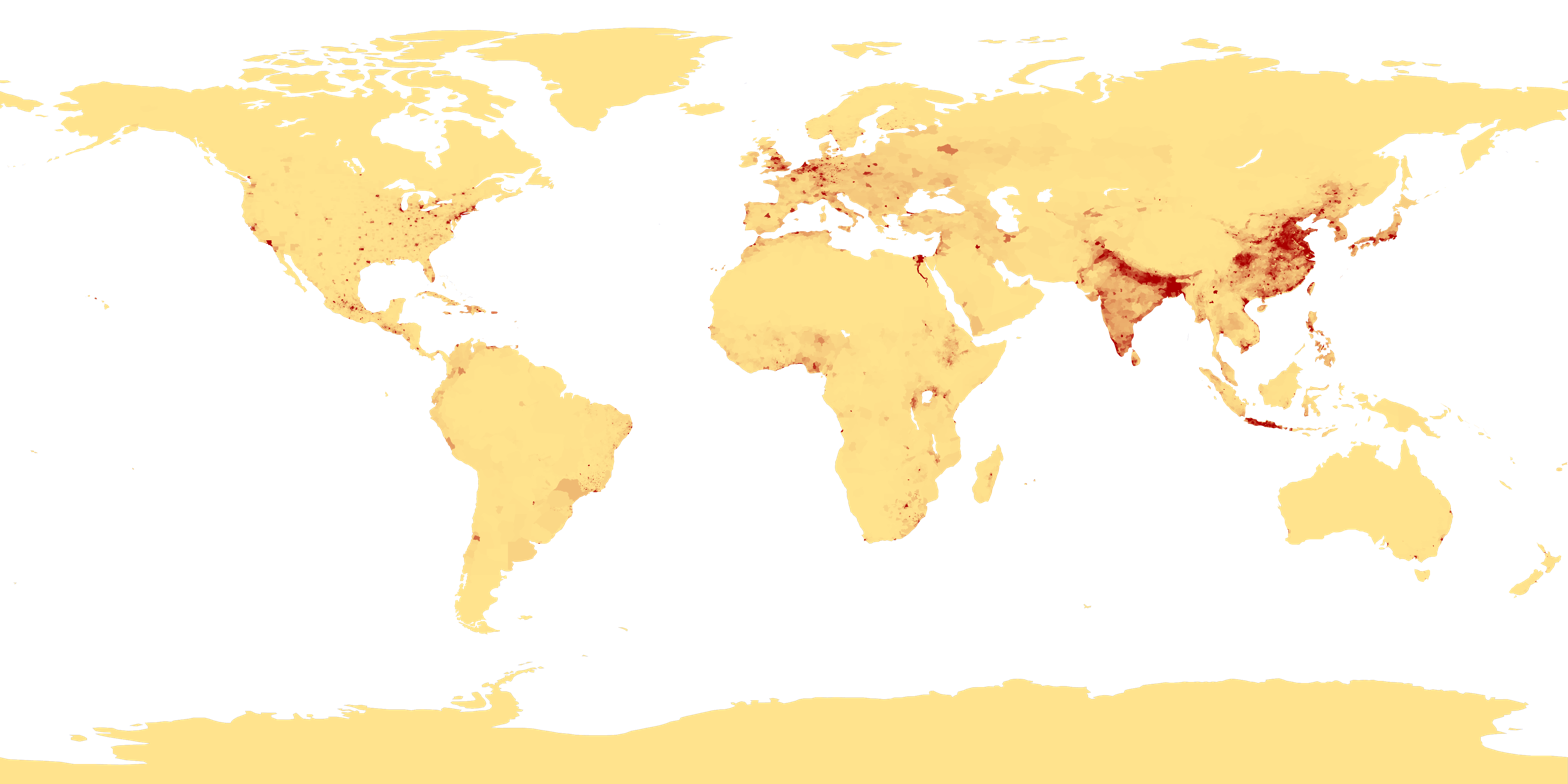
Map of world population density in 1994

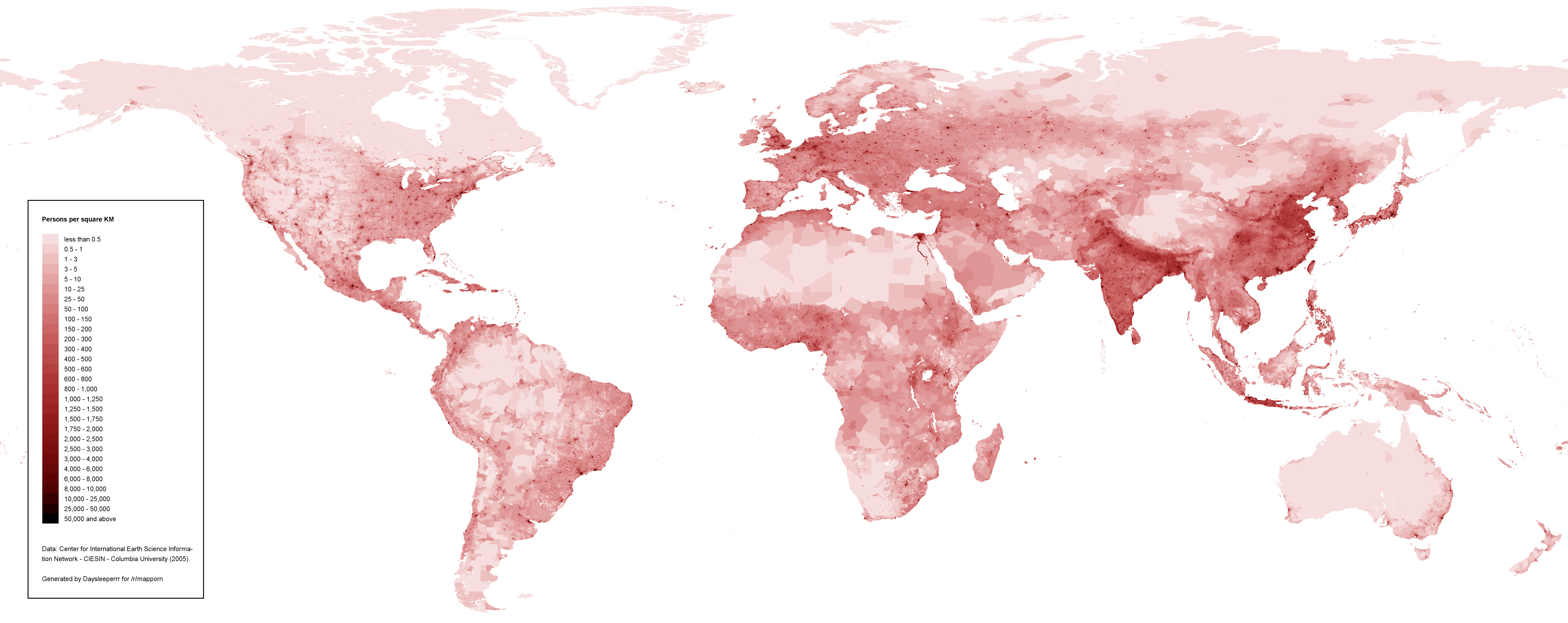
Map of world population density in 2005

Since its inception, population geography has taken at least three distinct but related forms, the most recent of which appears increasingly integrated with human geography in general. The earliest and most enduring form of population geography emerged in the 1950s, as part of spatial science. Pioneered by Glenn Trewartha, Wilbur Zelinsky, William A. V. Clark, and others in the United States, as well as Jacqueline Beaujeu-Garnier and Pierre George in France, it focused on the systematic study of the distribution of population as a whole and the spatial variation in population characteristics such as fertility and mortality. Population geography defined itself as the systematic study of:

1. the simple description of the location of population numbers and characteristics
2. the explanation of the spatial configuration of these numbers and characteristics
3. the geographic analysis of population phenomena (the inter-relations among real differences in population with those in all or certain other elements within the geographic study area).

Accordingly, it categorized populations as groups synonymous with political jurisdictions representing gender, religion, age, disability, generation, sexuality, and race, variables which go beyond the vital statistics of births, deaths, and marriages. Given the rapidly growing global population as well as the baby boom in affluent countries such as the United States, these geographers studied the relation between demographic growth, displacement, and access to resources at an international scale.

== Topics in population geography ==
- Demographic phenomena (natality, mortality, growth rates, etc.) through both space and time
- Increases or decreases in population numbers
- The movements and mobility of populations
- Occupational structure
- The way in which places in turn react to population phenomena, e.g. immigration

Research topics of other geographic sub-disciplines, such as settlement geography, also have a population geography dimension:

- The grouping of people within settlements
- The way from the geographical of places, e.g. settlement patterns

All of the above are looked at over space and time. Population geography also studies human-environment interactions, including problems from those relationships, such as overpopulation, pollution, and others.

A few types of maps that show the spatial layout of population are choropleth, isoline, and dot maps.

== See also ==
- World demographics
- Geodemography
- Geodemographic segmentation
