= Germaine Veyret-Verner =

French geographer

Germaine Veyret-Verner (17 September 1913 - 12 August 1973) was a French geographer and one of the first female university professors in France, known for her work on the Alps, her role in the development of geography and her international recognition relating to the Institut de géographie alpine in Grenoble and the Revue de géographie alpine.

== Life ==
=== Early life ===
Born Germaine Verner in Saint-Thibaud-de-Couz, she was the only daughter of two teachers from Savoie. She studied under Anne Dorne at a lycée for young women in Chambéry from 1924 to 1931 - Dorne had links to the Institut de Géographie Alpine and encouraged Verner to join the Faculté des Lettres de Grenoble where she became "pupil and spiritual daughter of Blanchard".

Germaine Verner joined the Institut de Géographie Alpine in 1932. and five years later attained her DES with a study on agriculture in the Grésivaudan, published in the Revue de Géographie Alpine (R.G.A). Next she taught at lycées in Valence, Gap and Chambéry before becoming a researcher at the CNRS In 1938 at Challes-les-Eaux she married fellow geographer Paul Veyret (1912-1988), dean of the faculté des Lettres de Grenoble from 1963 to 1968, and director of the Institut de Géographie alpine until his wife's death. Germaine Veyret-Verner was a major contributor to all her husband's achievements (the construction of the IGA and of the Saint-Martin d'Hères campus and the influence of the RGA), bringing "the organisational sense and sense of initiative which allowed them to realise their great achievements, that art of public relations which so contributed to the influence of geography from Grenoble".

=== Doctorate ===
She then gained a grant for her doctoral research. and in 1948 defended a thesis on industry in the French Alps before a panel comprising rectors André Allix (her thesis supervisor) and Jules Blache and deans Raoul Blanchard (geographer), Jean-Marcel Jeanneney (economist), Robert Latouche (historian) and Maurice Pardé. She was the second woman in France to gain a doctorate in geography, shortly after Jacqueline Beaujeu-Garnier. Blanchard said of her subject:

We could only praise all sorts of brilliant qualities - the certainty of the information, the judicious and reasonable tone, the guiding ideas, the sobriety of the argument's development, the vigour of the formulas and expressions ... the suppleness of the overall plan and of the detail. Overall everything made it a handsome book, which honoured the institution, which would be useful to geographers and even - a rare merit - interesting to most French people.

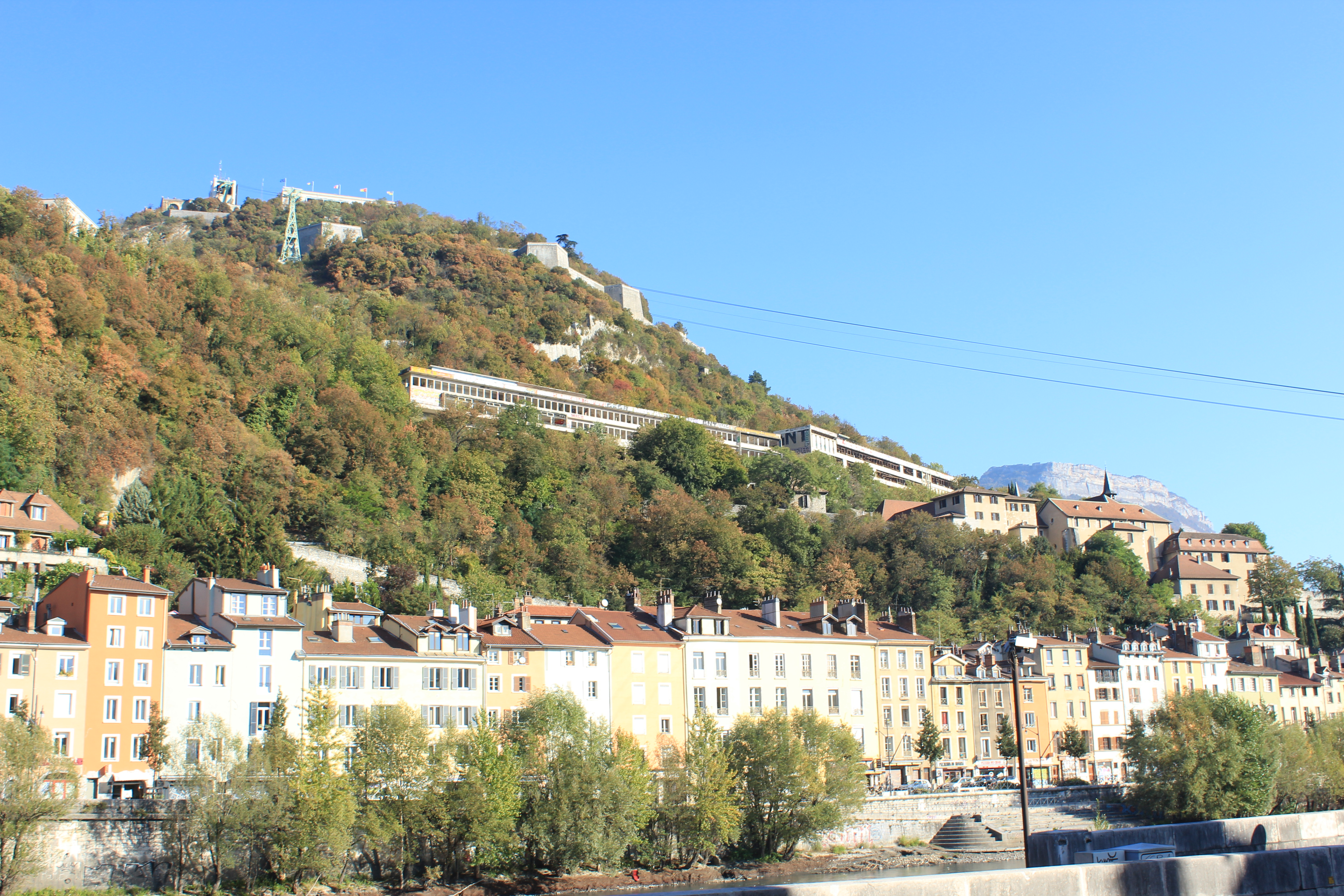
The Bastille at Grenoble on the Chartreuse mountain range, with at the centre the former university buildings of the Rabot and the student residence of the same name.

In 1949 she succeeded Max Derruau, who had left for Clermont-Ferrand, and was made professor of geography at the faculté des lettres de Grenoble, making her the second woman (after Jacqueline Beaujeu-Garnier in Lille to take up such a role. According to her husband, "her teaching, drawn from original research in human and regional geography, played a considerable part in the Institut de Géographie Alpine's rise during this period". She was promoted in 1953 and gained a personal chair.

=== Rise ===
In 1954 the couple succeeded Blanchard as chief editors of the Revue de Géographie Alpine (R.G.A) a role she took particularly to heart. She shifted the review towards economic, demographic and political questions and according to Anne Sgard "the objective was clear - the geographer is in the city, he [sic] has to explain, suggest, advise, make himself heard; and Germaine Veyret actively worked towards it, as well as maintaining the links with the political and industrial world established by Blanchard".

From 1961 to 1068 she was president of the Commission du Comité national français de géographie (CNFG) de géographie industrielle, then from 1969 to 1972 president of the Commission de Géographie urbaine du Comité national de géographie. She also took an active part in the work and congress of the International Association of Scientific Experts on Tourism, becoming president of its French section. Renowned for her great intelligence and her engagement with her students, she and her husband set up the Institut de Géographie Alpine on the Le Rabot slope in 1961

=== Later life ===
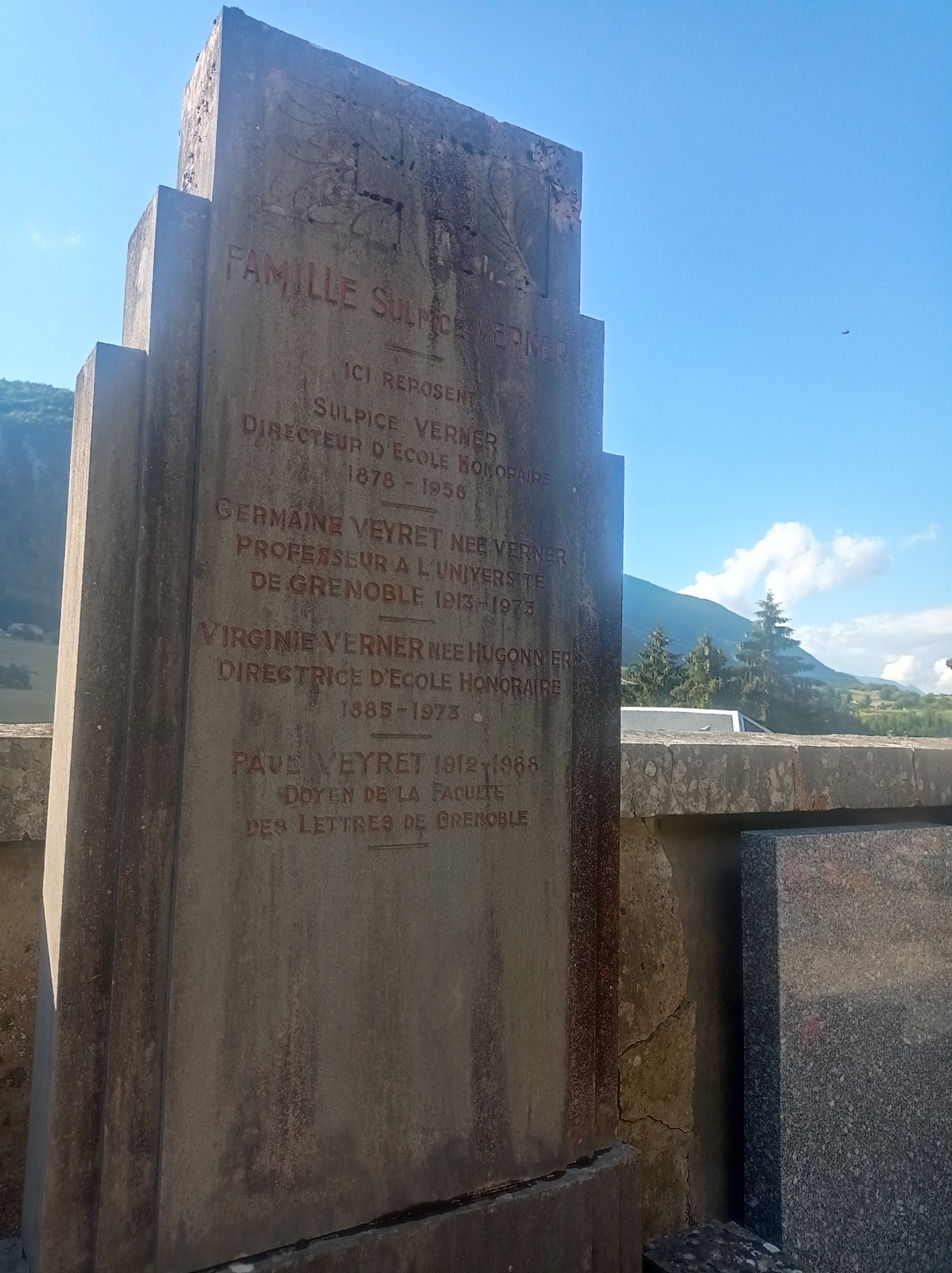
Her family grave

She is closely associated with the influence of the Institut and of the Revue de Géographie Alpine and was a member of the Grenoble group of the Association française des femmes diplômées des Universités She died of a heart attack in Grenoble and is buried in the cemetery in her birthplace.

== Work ==
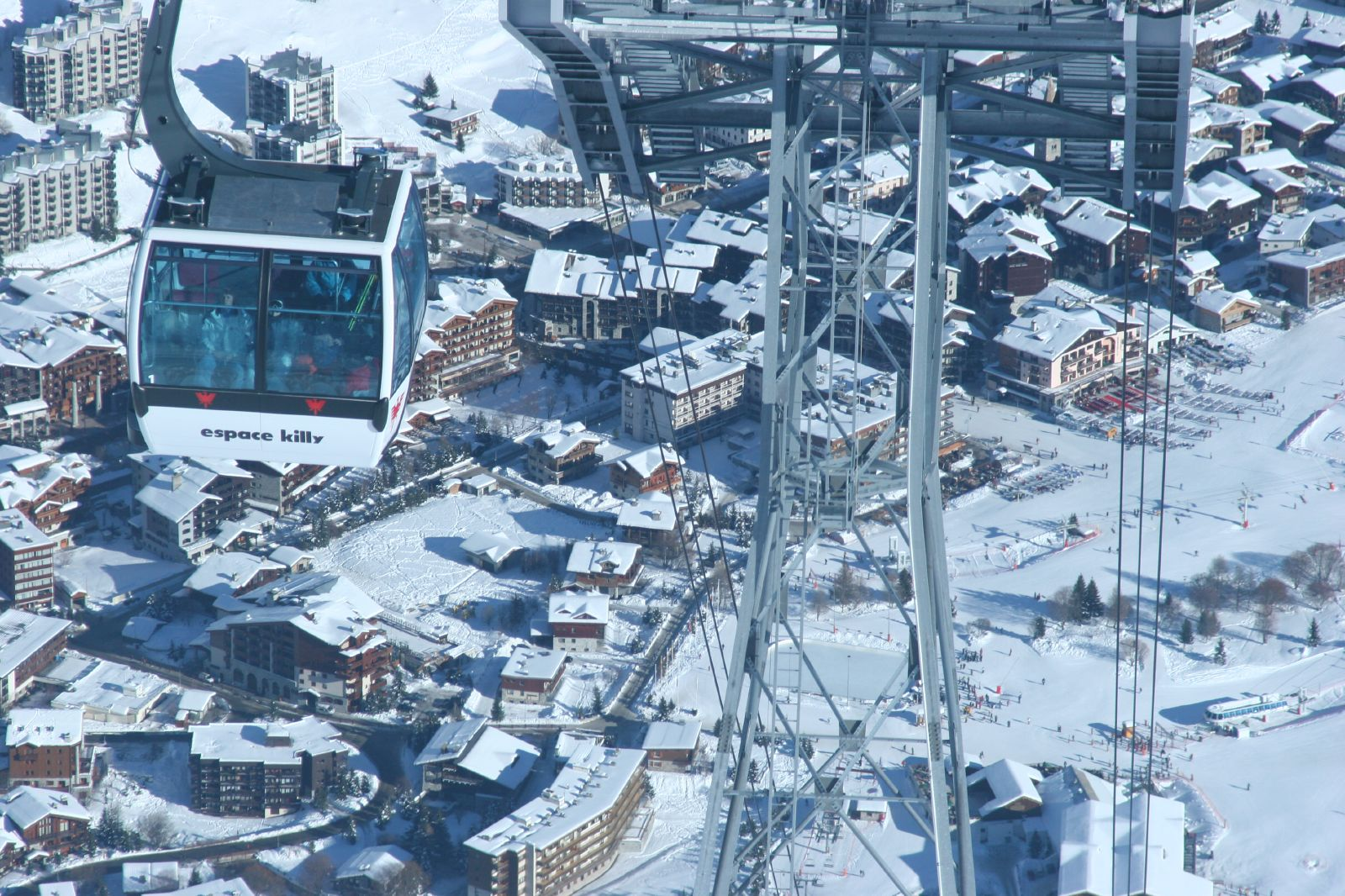
The station at Val-d'Isère

She initially worked on Alpine issues within regional geography before extending her reflections to all territories. She also worked on agricultural and industrial questions before specialising on questions of urbanism, population, tourism and planning. General and Alpine population geography formed a major part of her work. She analysed the major world population boom after the Second World War, as well as the rural flight in the Alps which seemed to lead to the abandonment of the mountains. She created an index of vitality which put the emphasis on the population's composition sorted by age and rectified fertility.

From 1956 onwards she also wrote on tourism - that year she published « Le tourisme au secours de la montagne : l'exemple de Val-d'Isère ». In 1959, in her article « La deuxième révolution économique et démographique des Alpes du Nord : les sports d'hiver. », she theorised on the links between winter sport tourism and demographics in mountain areas - for her tourism was less an independent activity than a means to maintain or bring back to the mountains the people who had abandoned them, guaranteeing them a decent life.

In the 1960s widespread urban growth led her to look at urban geography. Using Alpine examples, she questioned hasty generalisations on the phenomenon and defended small- and medium-sized towns against excessive urbanisation. These reflections led her to become involved in questions about planning and land use. She also played a major part in organising the second Alpine Economy Congress at the Institut de Géographie Alpine from 18 to 21 April 1963, joined the Comité d'Expansion économique de l'Isère et au bureau du Comité régional and took an active part in the fifth and sixth tourism plans. Her article « Aménager les Alpes : Mythes et réalités » summed up her theoretical contribution to the subject.

== Main works ==
- L'industrie des Alpes françaises, étude géographique, Grenoble, Arthaud, 1948, 371 p.
- Population. Mouvements, structures, répartition, Grenoble, Arthaud, 1959, 266 p.
- Grenoble et ses Alpes... (ill. Samivel), Grenoble, Arthaud, 1962, 298 p.
- Moyennes et petites villes des Alpes, Grenoble, Impr. Allier, 1964, 131 p.
- Au coeur de l'Europe, les Alpes, Paris, Flammarion, 1967, 548 p.
- Grenoble, capitale alpine, Grenoble, Arthaud, 1967, 247 p. (co-authored with her husband and Félix Germain)
- Les Grandes Alpes ensoleillées, Paris, Arthaud, 1970, 131 p. (co-authored with her husband)
- Atlas et géographie des Alpes françaises, Genève-Paris, Famot - Flammarion, 1979, 316 p. (co-authored with her husband)
