= Health campaign =

Educational or informational campaign related to public or individual health

A health campaign is a type of media campaign which attempts to promote public health by making new health interventions available. The organizers of a health campaign frequently use education along with an opportunity to participate further, such as when a vaccination campaign seeks both to educate the public about a vaccine and provide the vaccine to people who want it. When a health campaign has international relevance it may be called a global health campaign.

== Examples ==
=== Health education ===
Many diseases and medical problems have a "health education campaign" or "awareness campaign" associated with them. The goal of such a campaign is to make people conscious of the impact of diseases and to provide them information about the disease if they want to learn more about it.

=== Eradication of infectious diseases ===
Various health campaigns have taken the goal of eradicating infectious diseases, for example by promoting vaccination take-up. In some campaigns, the organizers recruit the public to participate in the campaign by talking about it with others and encouraging others to participate.

For example, in 2016, the Ministry of Health (MoH) of Brazil created a public health campaign to reduce the outbreak of syphilis. The “Syphilis No!” Project had six main activities and actions to facilitate this campaign: Educommunication; Qualification of Strategic Information; Strengthening the Partnership between the MoH and other actors; Enlargement of Research Committees for Vertical Transmission of HIV (Human Immunodeficiency Virus), Syphilis and Viral Hepatitis; Strengthening of Health Care Networks; and Rapid Response to Syphilis in Health Care Networks. The objective of this project was to prevent pregnant women from contracting syphilis and eradicating the breakout. This campaign ran from 2018 to 2019 and was streamed on all social media platforms, televised on commercials and games, and printed out in newspapers.

=== Behavior modification campaign ===
An organization may create a campaign which asks for participants to change their behavior in some way. Examples of such projects are smoking cessation campaigns which ask people to quit smoking, HIV prevention campaigns which ask people to do things such as use condoms to reduce HIV infection risk, or exercise campaigns which encourage people to engage in physical activity for health.

=== Organizations as campaigns ===
In some cases the work of an organization may itself be a health campaign. This may happen when, for example, an organization exists to provide health information or medical resources to anyone who requests them. The organization itself may conduct a series of health campaigns, and its entire operation may be called a health campaign.

== Communication Strategies ==
Campaigns use a variety of communication strategies to change and influence the targeted population political and economic context in which they make certain health decisions. The decisions on which strategies to use are based on information collected on the existing behavioral patterns and barriers. A common strategy used is direct communication. Direct communication is used when the campaign presumes that the target audience may be able to change his or her behavior, which may not always be the case. If there are certain environmental obstacles hindering the targeted audience, then it would be effective to advocate for policy change and to use policy makers as advocators. While advocacy campaigns may be used more towards opinion leaders, the campaign will put a little more pressure on the public to get involved more in the decision-making process of their policies.

== Social Media Based Framework ==
Social media has been shown to influence behaviors of others and has been proven to be a powerful tool to reach millions of people. While many studies have also shown that social media has led to misinformation, there are frameworks that can guide people to use social media as a tool in creating health campaigns. The first step of this framework is to tailor the message and target them to specific populations. The second step is to include members of the population in the development. The third step is to identify and address the misinformation that was spread. The fourth step is to leverage information sharing. The fifth and final step is to evaluate the outcome and impact of the campaign.

== Health Campaign Design: ACME Framework ==
The Audience-Channel-Message-Evaluation (ACME) framework provides integrated guidance for effective health communication campaign design, implementation, and evaluation. The ACME framework suggests four principles to follow when developing a health communication campaign: 1) audience segmentation, 2) channel selection, 3) theory-based message design, and 4) outcome evaluation. The four principles are interconnected in guiding every decision point over the course of health campaign development. For instance, audience segmentation implies channel selection, message design, and evaluation plans. Message design additionally determines channel selection and vice versa. Evaluation is carried out through the whole campaign development and implementation rather than a one-time, separate assessment.

=== Audience (Who?) ===
The first principle to consider when developing an effective campaign is to identify the target audience. The procedure is also known as audience segmentation, which refers to a step narrowing down a homogenous audience to a heterogenous audience that shares similar patterns of beliefs, behaviors, and values. Segmentation strategies could be as broad as focusing on demographic or geographic characteristics such as gender and location. Yet it could also be as specific as dividing groups based on shared attitudes toward a given object (e.g., positive attitudes toward a promoted health behavior) or similar behaviors (e.g., performing healthy eating behaviors).

For instance, guided by the Risk Perception Attitude (RPA) framework, people can be segmented into four attitudinal groups based on their risk perception and self-efficacy, including responsive group (high risk, high efficacy), avoidance group (high risk, low efficacy), proactive group (low risk, high efficacy), and indifference group (low risk, low efficacy). Putting into a health promotion context aiming for increasing young adults' use of genetic tests, young adults can be further segmented into four groups based on their genetic risk and efficacy beliefs. Those who have a high-risk perception toward genetic diseases and believe in engaging in self-protective health behaviors can protect their genes belong to the group of activists (i.e., responsive group in RPA). Those who have a high-risk perception toward genetic diseases but do not believe they have the ability to protect their genes by engaging in health behaviors belong to the threatened group (i.e., avoidance group in RPA). Those who believe in the positive impact of health behaviors on genes but do not feel at risk of genetic diseases belong to the group of controllers (i.e., proactive group in RPA). Lastly, those who are not aware of the risk of genetic diseases nor the benefit of health behaviors belong to the group of skeptics (i.e., indifferent group in RPA). Depending on how the audience is segmented, campaign designers can tailor more specific messages and deliver the messages via the most appropriate channel to the targeted group.

=== Channel (How?) ===
The principle of channel selection determines the effectiveness of campaign implementation. The key underlying question here is how to reach the target audience defined by the first principle (audience segmentation) and how to ensure the campaign messages can be viewed by the intended group of people with multiple exposures. Broadly, communication channels can be selected from two categories: interpersonal or computer-mediated communication channels. Additionally, communication channels can differ in small features such as access, reach, specialization, depth, and credibility. For example, television and print media are two distinct channels differing in access and specialization. As technology continues to advance the media landscape, digital channels such as social media or other interactive tools can also be included in the considerations. With wide choices of channel selection, multi-channel dissemination can be more desirable and effective than single channel. The length of delivery time on the chosen channels is another decision needed to be considered in this process.

=== Message (What?) ===
The principle of message design is guided by audience segmentation and behavioral theories. When specific characteristics of the target audience are in mind, campaign designers have more room to tailor the message to be personally relevant and thus increase persuasiveness. Behavioral theories can help campaign designers to recognize the underlying behavioral determinants that are in need of change to realize the campaign goal. Guided by theories, messages can be designed to embody those latent behavioral determinants to better secure the success of the campaign in changing a specific behavior.

For instance, according to Extended Parallel Process Model (EPPM), people are more likely to adapt their behaviors when they have a high perceived threat and high perceived efficacy to avoid the threat. Messages thus can be designed to elicit individuals' perceptions of threat and efficacy. Putting into an AIDS education context, messages can embody a threat by emphasizing the severity of HIV infection, such as showing graphic photographs of late-stage AIDS victims and vividly describing the health consequences. To elicit perceived efficacy, messages can highlight the effectiveness of using condoms to reduce the risk of HIV transmission and the ease of using condoms.

=== Evaluation (Did it work?) ===
The principle of evaluation in the ACME framework emphasizes conducting a set of assessments, rather than a one-time, separate process. It refers to three aspects of evaluation: 1) formative evaluation, 2) process evaluation, and 3) outcome evaluation. Formative evaluation focuses on evaluating the initial campaign design, examining whether audience segmentation, channel selection, and message design are clear and interconnected. Process evaluation concerns the effectiveness of campaign implementation, ensuring the campaign's reach and exposure to the intended audiences. Outcome evaluation examines the success of a campaign in achieving intended effects while ruling out unintended effects.

== See also ==
- Health communication
- Public health
- Audience segmentation
- Behavioral change theories
- Message design logic

== Sources ==
- World Health Organization (2009). Public health campaigns: getting the message across. Geneva, Switzerland: World Health Organization. ISBN 978-92-4-056027-7.
- Maibach, Edward; Parrott, Roxanne Louiselle (1995). Designing health messages: approaches from communication theory and public health practice. Thousand Oaks, Calif.: Sage Publications. ISBN 978-0-8039-5398-7.
- Rice, Ronald E.; Atkin, Charles K. (2013). Public Communication Campaigns. Thousand Oaks, Calif: SAGE. ISBN 978-1-4129-8770-7.
- Wallack, Lawrence; Woodruff, Katie; Dorfman, Lori (1999). News for a change: an advocate's guide to working with the media. Thousand Oaks: Sage Publications. ISBN 978-0-7619-1924-7.
