= Michael A. Gilbert =

American-Canadian argumentation theorist

- Born: 1945 (age 80–81); Brooklyn, New York

Academic background
- Education: Hunter College, City University of New York (BA) University of Waterloo (PhD)
- Thesis: A Formal Analysis of Relevance

Academic work
- Discipline: Argumentation theory, Gender studies
- Sub-discipline: Philosophy, Linguistics, Social psychology, Communication theory, Gender modality
- Institutions: University of Toronto York University
- Notable works: Multi-modal argumentation, Coalescent argumentation

Michael Alan Gilbert (born 1945), also known by his femme alter ego Miqqi Alicia Gilbert, is an American-Canadian argumentation theorist, cross-dresser, author, academic, activist and professor emeritus at York University's Department of Philosophy.

His first field of research is the interdisciplinary area of argumentation theory that cuts across philosophy, linguistics, social psychology, and communication theory. His approach emphasizes and demands credibility for non-logical modes of communication, rooted in the belief that information, particularly in arguments, is exchanged "not through statements, but through messages which include familiar meaning, context, bodily communications, power relations, and intuitions". His most notable work is on models of argumentation that challenge logical, dialectical, and rhetorical traditions. He developed the theories of multi-modal argumentation and coalescent argumentation to showcase and address the mechanisms used by interlocutors to argue in the marketplace.

Gilbert's second area of research is gender studies, examining the foundation and nature of the socially constructed gender binary, and its implementation across institutional and social settings. He explores the role of gender diversity as a catalyst for disrupting the norm and unsettling the binary. As a life-long cross dresser, he studies the practice both as Michael and Miqqi Alicia Gilbert, his femme alter ego, to re-establish cross-dressing as an "opportunity for personal growth and exploration."

== Early life and education ==
Gilbert was born and raised in Brooklyn, New York, where he attended Erasmus Hall High School. He completed an undergraduate degree in philosophy and political science from Hunter College, City University of New York. Until June 1968, he studied graduate-level philosophy at State University of New York (SUNY), where his interest in logic first began. In September 1968, he emigrated to Canada for "political reasons" and enrolled in University of Waterloo. He started looking into the paradoxes of material implication that focus on anomalous theorems [p כ (q כ p)] ("a true statement is implied by everything") and [~p כ (p כ q)] ("a false statement implies everything"). Scholars Nuel Belnap and Alan Ross Anderson "introduced relevance to the idea of logic as a means of fixing these paradoxes." Gilbert's doctoral thesis entitled "A Formal Analysis of Relevance" argued that the idea of relevance they relied on was "simplistic and did not do the job it was intended to." He was awarded a PhD in philosophy in 1974.

== Career ==
To supplement his income during his final year of graduate studies, Gilbert developed a course entitled "How to Win an Argument" for Conestoga College in Kitchener, Ontario. Soon after, he was offered a contract position at the University of Toronto's Department of Philosophy, where he was a lecturer from 1973 to 1975. Between 1974 and 1980, he taught the course at University of Toronto's School of Continuing Studies.

In 1975, Gilbert was appointed as a professor of philosophy at York University and directed the Department of Philosophy's undergraduate program through the 1990s and 2000s. As of 2018, he is a professor emeritus at York University.

Gilbert was known to deliver lectures as Miqqi Alicia once every semester. In doing so, he transformed into a "walking illustration" of the core tenets underpinning his scholarship – one that positioned gender as a social construct "propped up by deeply imbedded conditioning" and affirmed that "what is constructed can be deconstructed" insofar that the sex you're born with should not limit your freedom to cross over into another.

In 1999, Salon reported that while teaching a second-year philosophy course on gender and sexuality, Gilbert asked his class of 90 students if they'd be interested in a question-answer session with a transgender person and witness a "living deconstruction of gender dichotomy." While most students agreed to participate, he did issue a formal warning that those uncomfortable with the idea of seeing such a person should skip the upcoming class. A few days later, the tenured professor showed up as Miqqi Alicia, dressed in a skirt, sweater, and low heels. Her walk was "more tentative" in comparison to Michael's "lumbering gait." Her nails were manicured and she wore earrings. As she entered, the students whispered and giggled. She allowed the class ten to fifteen minutes to get used to her femme alter ego, before proceeding with her lecture. She started by explaining that transgender is an umbrella term that applied to "anyone who is uncomfortable with, objects to or plays with his or her birth-designated gender." Next, she told her students that a male cross-dresser doesn't consider himself to be a woman. "I'm a man with a man's body and I don't want anyone to touch it with a scalpel," she explained. The students were supportive of Gilbert's en femme appearance, taking notes and addressing him as Miqqi. A male student pointed out how "all professors impose their styles and lives on their class, from their worn tweed jackets with leather patches to the endless heterosexual references to wives and children." A female student noted that Miqqi Alicia subverted the "creepiness factor" and dispelled common stereotypes associated with transgender people. "It's not sexual. [Michael] is not being caught going through his wife's underwear or wearing garters and heels," she added.

In the year leading up to his classroom appearance as Miqqi Alicia, Gilbert received mainstream media coverage for intentionally "self-outing". He believed that a tenured academic, especially one belonging to a marginalized group, ought to say what's unpopular. "I have the obligation to expose myself as transgendered in order that others, for whom the risk might be greater, can also do so," he said.

York University honoured Gilbert with the Dean's Award for Excellence in Teaching for full-time Tenured Faculty for his "creative teaching strategies and commitment to deep and sustained learning."

== Research ==
=== Models of argumentation ===
Gilbert's models of argumentation recognize that discourse cannot always be taken at face value. He discourages reviewing discourse from a strict logical lens and resorting to literal understandings i.e. emotions do not belong in arguments; innuendo or sarcasm do not belong, and so on. Instead, his emphasis is on observing what is happening and uncovering what lies at the heart of an argument i.e. the sociolinguistic and sociopsychological aspects. Other argumentation experts, most notably Barbara O'Keefe who proposed the communication theory of message design logic, have opted for similar approaches in this field.

According to Gilbert, his work on argumentation aligns more closely with the traditional rhetoric ("an argument is an attempt at persuasion to reach an agreement") as opposed to logic, which focuses on the product of the argument or dialectical concerns such as interaction between interlocutors. "In the logical view, we express everything in propositions while in the rhetorical we express ourselves in messages," he explained. He finds traditional rhetoric to be "more contextual" as it offers "a lot more information than the mysterious and highly metaphysical proposition." As a result, both multi-modal argumentation and coalescent argumentation are "less antagonistic to the rhetorical argumentative tradition than the logical one" with the former recognizing the "modes of persuasion utilized by arguers" and the latter theorizing that "arguments can function from agreement." That said, Gilbert's work parts with the rhetorical tradition by not relying on oral or written language as a means of persuasion. His work is influenced by contemporary rhetorical theorists Wayne Brockriede and Charles Arthur Willard. He agrees with latter that "people will use all the tools available to them to persuade, and these tools are not always verbal or direct."

==== Multi-model argumentation ====
With a background in philosophical tradition and extensive training in logic, Gilbert's work challenges how logic conceives of arguments. In 1976, his first paper in the area of formal logic was published by Notre Dame Journal of Formal Logic. While teaching an introductory course on logic as a graduate student, he realized that his class, consisting predominantly of pupils from an arts background, struggled with formal logic. Pupils with an engineering background however found formal logic less challenging, but did not account for its philosophical aspects. "That class really caused me to pause and think, leading me to design a curriculum that taught non-standard logic," Gilbert said, "I started to become unhappy with formal logic and my redesigned curriculum was motivated by philosophical issues, such as truths and falsities." He also observed that people in the marketplace did not argue very logically most of the time. "It's not that they were being illogical; it was that they weren't using just logic when they argued. They demonstrated other ways of thinking," Gilbert explained. As a philosopher, he continued to become more and more dissatisfied with formal logic because he felt that it wasn't serving the public. "Teaching modal logic or working with logical axioms, did not truly impact how we reason in real argumentative settings," he said, "Formal logic, and even informal logic, focus on arguments as products or proof. When we evaluate an argument's premises and determine whether they support their conclusion – this has limited usefulness for solving disagreements between people."

In his book How to Win an Argument (1979), he described a "visceral" argument between friends about whether a woman could be a police officer. Gilbert noted that when a man claimed that women cannot be police officers, the woman responded by flipping him over her shoulder. These "recollections of influences" prompted his development of the multi-modal argumentation model that respects the "rhetorical tradition" and is based on how people actually conduct themselves in an argument. The model provided a taxonomy of arguments, proposing four argument modes that act as a "vehicle for relaying a message in argumentation." The modes are as follows: logical (arguments rooted in traditional, reasoned view), emotional (arguments that use emotion for rationale), visceral (arguments that rely on physical or environmental factors, e.g. an eye roll), and kisceral (arguments that rest on the intuition or energy).

According to Gilbert: "An argument's persuasive force is based on the mode that is most prominent in each argument." He theorized that argumentative interactions rarely occur in a single mode and typically feature a combination of these modes, with one of them being the "more predominant mode of persuasion based on particular circumstances." In later publications, he acknowledged that these modes are not exhaustive.

Gilbert believes that it is not theoretically important for multi-modal argumentation to have a normative framework given that the model is "highly situationally focused". According to him, situational rationality allows the rules people create to be accepted in a particular argumentative encounter, thereby agreeing with Christopher Tisdale's proposition that arguers "create rhetorical situations in which the rules and processes are contextually dependent". For example, people who yell in argumentative discussions are likely to be shunned and isolated for going against the universally-accepted rule of not being verbally abusive to others in a conversation.

Gilbert doesn't consider himself to be "anti-logical" but clarifies that "logic does not serve [his] purpose." In 2011, he further argued that informal logic can embrace multi-modal argumentation by liberating itself from the "yolk of formal logic."

==== Coalescent argumentation ====
As a young scholar, Gilbert noticed that the biggest compliment that one could receive was "he is very bright," insofar to mean that "he was a good fighter." He was disturbed by this aspect of philosophy that focused on disagreement. Eventually, he came to understand that the lack of focus on agreement was a direct result of the importance designated to the concept of "truth". Early in his career, when he presented a paper at a Computer Science conference, he stated that 1 + 1 does not always equal 2 as a "sophism for philosophers." Later, he was approached by a mathematician who argued that the statement was not a sophism and referenced mathematical theories to validate his point. Through this interaction, Gilbert realized that people often mistake their goals during an argument, convinced that they want one thing when they want another. "For example, I ask to borrow your car today, but my real goal is to do my errands. And you tell me that no one can drive your car except you. Then, when you find out I need to run errands, you offer to drive me into town so that I can complete my errands, and my goal has been achieved," he clarified.

Gilbert would go on to theorize that reaching an agreement during argumentation necessitates taking goals into account, leading to the development of the coalescent argumentation model that focuses on seeking points of agreement rather than disagreement in argumentation. He further positioned coalescent argumentation as a "normative ideal" that emphasizes the "willingness to explore what matters to all arguers" by uncovering their "values, attitudes, beliefs, or feelings" to reach a point of agreement. "What may seem like very diverse viewpoints are brought closer together (coalesced) in this way," he wrote in a paper presented at first International Conference of the Ontario Society for the Study of Argumentation at Brock University, St. Catherines.

The coalescent argumentation model aligns with the Harvard Business School's principled negotiation model and cooperative arguing models similar to those proposed by Josina M. Makau and Debian L. Marty.

==== Applications in argumentation theory ====
According to Gilbert, people feel inclined to use the four modes of argument to move the other party towards a logical understanding or conclusion. However, more often than not, the conclusion might not even be logical, due to the presence of logical components but not a completely logical discourse. He uses child custody arrangements and instances of shared childcare to further illustrate his theory. "How one feels about the children is very important. If I can understand as a co-parent that you feel strongly about little Johnny, as strongly as I do, that's really important," he explained. In this scenario, a more logical course of action is to come up with a solution that both parents agree to ("I will do this and you will do that"), but to get there they "must feel that it's right." The emotion, that the solution is "right," carries more weight than a "logical presentation of arguments."

Gilbert recommends that custody mediators can observe the "emotional or visceral cues" in disputants and explain that they (disputants) are making an assertion when they roll their eyes. An eye roll conveys a message akin to "I don't like that" and is no different than the verbal counterpart. As a result, it requires an explanation and elaboration for clarity during the mediation, specially when verbal messages are also subjected to similar line of questioning.

=== Gender studies ===
Gilbert's academic scholarship evolved to include to gender, particularly transgender, issues after the death of his second wife in 1984; he was 39 years old at the time. "I realized that life wasn't a dress rehearsal," he told Salon in an interview. "I began to come out, and I felt less of a separation between my cross-dressing self and my academic self. I began to explore it philosophically." Out of the many groups and subgroups of transgender people, his work focuses on three: early-declared transsexuals (those who identified and came out as transsexual in their childhood), late-declared transsexuals (those who came out as transsexual in their adulthood), and cross-dressers.

His early research showed that "early-declared transsexuals do not have a strong sense of difference in personality or internal phenomenology before and after transition from one gender to another." However, due to the "public nature of socialization" that allows transgender individuals with the possibility of becoming a member of the "opposite" sex, an average cross dresser or a late-declared transsexual may not have a "strong and early enough identification to qualify on this ground." In 2008, he received a grant from Social Sciences and Humanities Research Council of Canada to conduct a "careful scholarly investigation on the philosophical basis of the distinction between early and late-declared transsexuals, and its implications for gender theory." Using open-ended informal interviews, Gilbert collected information on the "social and internal experiences of both late-declared transsexuals and cross-dressers" to better understand their experiences of pursuing a gender- transition. He intended for these discussions to enter into and investigate the "raging dispute" surrounding the concept of autogynephilia proposed by Ray Blanchard which distinguishes between early-declared transsexuals and late-declared transsexuals or and cross-dressers based on the underlying motivations and causes for their gender diversity. Gilbert's investigation also explored the extent of influence that external social forces have on a transgender individual's experience and personal identity.

=== Similarities and overlaps between theories of argumentation and gender ===
Gilbert's "denial of bifurcations" influences both areas of his scholarship. His cross-dressing and transgender identity defiles the male-female distinction. Entering a more "feminine mode" and familiarizing himself with feminism and feminist rationality furthered his understanding of how different modes are essential and that personal value systems are ever-changing. His multi-modal argumentation model is informed by this inclusive approach. As a result, his overarching work in theories of gender and argumentation are come across as more conceptually similar than not.

== Cross-dressing ==
Gilbert describes himself as a "committed" cross-dresser. "The term 'committed' encompasses, for me, two essential items. The first concerns one's self-identity, the second an approach to what one is doing that includes a mature thoughtfulness and a reflective view of gender roles," he wrote. His "personal road to commitment" began after his first wife alluded to Gilbert being a "transvestite” based on conversations with her therapist. His reaction, in response, was to be "nonplussed". On one hand, he felt "categorized and somewhat medicalized" for being "neatly labeled". On the other hand, he realized that, as a "good academic," he could now "trot off to the nearest library" and "read all about [himself]." Gilbert proceeded to take out all the books his university had on the subject—"which as I recall correctly was about three”—and discovered that he was "far from alone." He credits "external stimulus" for his self-awareness while acknowledging that for others, it often comes from "various avenues ranging from being advised by a therapist to stumbling across an internet site."

Gilbert considers feminism to be an "extremely important" part of being a committed cross dresser. According to him, his "woman-self" exists and is tutored by "paying careful attention to the habits, values and customs of the women around [him]." He believes that the insistence of trans exclusionary radical feminists (TERFs) that "no one not born a woman can be a woman […] flies in the face of the difficulties of defining female and male, the reality of the social construction of gender and the reality of innumerable trans people."

In September 1998, Gilbert traveled from Canada to Oxford, England to present a paper on socialization at the third International Congress on Gender and Sexuality. Instead of being grouped in a session with other scholars talking on the subject, he was placed in a session with papers on petticoat punishment and cross-dressing in theatre settings. "In other words, I was classed not by the subject of my essay, but by my being a cross-dresser," he said. For Gilbert, this wasn't an unusual occurrence. Reflecting on the incident, he said: "There are organizations, for example, that exclude transsexuals from membership. Rather than educate their members and their families about transsexuality, it's easier to remain exclusive and discriminatory. This can result in transsexuals not having as strong an organizing base as they might if cross-dressers were included, and often being isolated due to insufficient resources. This attitude on the part of some cross-dressers underscores the idea that cross-dressers are not serious about their gender theorizing, and are not reflective about their role as gender outlaws and their place in the wider transgender community."

As a cross-dresser, Gilbert goes by the name Miqqi Alicia Gilbert. S/he is the book review editor and regular columnist for Transgender Tapestry, the magazine of the International Foundation for Gender Education (IFGE). S/he received the IFGE Trinity Award in 2007. S/he is a founding member of the Toronto transgender group Xpressions, and was the director of Fantasia Fair (now known as TransWeek), an annual week-long conference that convenes cross-dressers, transgender and gender questioning people in Provincetown, Massachusetts. S/he was the recipient of TransWeek's 2025 Transgender Pioneer Award for paving the way for the "broader acceptance and understanding" of those "searching for community and self-expression."

== Activism ==
In 1995, Gilbert attended the first International Congress on Gender, Crossdressing, and Sex, where he met and befriended Jake Hale, a transgender professor at California State University, Northridge. That same year, the president of York University assembled a taskforce on heterosexism and homosexuality to ensure that the institution was more open, more accessible and more welcoming for gender-diverse people. Gilbert, who was otherwise supportive of the taskforce, noticed that the mandate did not mention trans people at all. In response, he drafted a memo to the administration and was invited to voice his concerns in front of a committee. Speaking of the challenges trans people face in university settings, Gilbert underscored the need for gender-neutral spaces on campus: "A transitioning male to female [person] is at work all day, comes to campus, has to shave. Where do you go? Do you go to the men's room, wearing women's clothes, or the women's room and stand there shaving? It doesn't work, right?"

The committee was receptive to Gilbert's suggestions and added twelve recommendations to their report, including gender-inclusive washrooms. As a result, all wheelchair-accessible washrooms at York University are now marked as trans-inclusive. This initiative was first brought to a Students with Disabilities organization for review because of a predominant concern: "Are we taking away their space?" Once the organization confirmed that they were unanimously in favour of the proposal, Gilbert decided to lend his support to the initiative by publicly coming out as transgender. "I came to believe that my having tenure, which meant that I could not be fired for having or doing something unpopular, was a double-edged sword. If I was doing or believing something unpopular, it was incumbent upon me to stand up," he said. He first came out to his gender and sexuality class on femme identity and expression. His experience was positive; he was embraced by his university and received mainstream media coverage.

== Personal life ==
Gilbert identifies as a heterosexual and goes by both male and female pronouns depending on how he's dressed.

Gilbert has been married thrice. He was married to his first wife for fourteen years until their divorce, and his second wife for two years before being widowed. He has been married to his current wife for thirty years. He has one son and five grandchildren.

== Publications ==
Gilbert published the first edition of How to Win an Argument with McGraw-Hill in 1979, the second in 1996 with John Wiley and Sons, and the third in 2008 with University Press of America. In the 1980s published two novels, Office Party and Yellow Angel, with former being adapted into a screenplay for Hostile Takeover (1988) by Canadian director George Mihalka. He also authored Coalescent Argumentation (1997), first published by Lawrence Erlbaum Associates (acquired by Taylor & Francis), and Arguing with People (2014), published by Broadview Press.

=== Books ===
- Arguing with People. 2014. Broadview Press. ISBN 978-1554811700.
- Coalescent Argumentation. 1997. New Jersey: Lawrence Erlbaum Associates.
- Yellow Angel. 1985. New York: Simon & Schuster Pocketbooks.
- Office Party. 1981. New York: Linden Press/Simon & Schuster.
- How To Win An Argument .1979. New York: McGraw-Hill.

=== Journal articles ===
- Gilbert, M. 2018. Multi-Modal 2020: Multi-Modal Argumentation 30 Years Later. Puppo, F. (eds.) Informal Logic 42(3):487-506. doi:10.22329/il.v42i3.7497
- Gilbert, M. 2007. Natural normativity: Argumentation theory as an engaged discipline. Informal Logic 27(2): 149–161.
- Gilbert, M. 2011. The Kisceral: Reason and Intuition in Argumentation. Argumentation. 25: 163–170. doi:10.1007/s10503-011-9210-2.
- Gilbert, Miqqi Alicia (2009–07). "Defeating Bigenderism: Changing Gender Assumptions in the Twenty-first Century. Hypatia. 24 (3): 93–112. doi:10.1111/j.1527-2001.2009.01047.x. ISSN 0887-5367
