= Melting pot (disambiguation) =

The melting pot is an analogy for the way in which heterogeneous societies become more homogeneous.

Melting pot may also refer to:

- Crucible, a container in which materials can be heated to very high temperatures
- The Melting Pot (restaurant), an American chain of fondue restaurants
- Fondue, a Swiss dish typically cooked and served in a melting pot for cheese, etc.

== In media ==
- Melting Pot (film), a 1998 film starring Paul Rodriguez
- Melting Pot (The Charlatans album), 1998
- Melting Pot (Booker T album), 1971, or the title song
- Melting Pot (Zoe Rahman album), 2006
- The Melting Pot (TV series), a 1975 sitcom
- "Melting Pot" (song), a 1969 song by Blue Mink
- "Melting Pot", a 1996 song by Boyzone from A Different Beat
- "Melting Pot", a 2004 song by Pitbull featuring Trick Daddy from M.I.A.M.I.
- The Melting Pot (play), a 1908 play by Israel Zangwill
- The Melting Pot, an American socialist journal (published 1913–1920) edited by Henry M. Tichenor
- The Melting Pot (comics), a 1995 graphic novel by Kevin Eastman, Simon Bisley and Eric Talbot
- The Melting Pot (film), a lost 1915 silent film drama

== See also ==
- Crucible (disambiguation)
