= Stan Openshaw =

British geographer (1946–2022)

Stan Openshaw (10 August 1946 – 19 May 2022.) was a British academic and geographer. His last post was professor of human geography based in the School of Geography at the University of Leeds.

== Academic career ==
Openshaw began a research career in the Department of Town and Country Planning at Newcastle University, where, during the 1970s he worked on zone design methodology and the analysis of socio-economic data in geographical and planning contexts. In the 1980s, Stan collaborated on the BBC Domesday Project and developed a way to estimate death or kill rates of various nuclear bombing strategies evolving computerised techniques for identifying geographical clusters.

Openshaw worked at Newcastle University for eighteen years, becoming professor of quantitative geography before moving to work at the University of Leeds in 1992 where he set up the Centre for Computational Geography and debated the direction geography should take, putting forward a view that the subject needed an applied and scientific edge that harnessed the growing power of computers to have positive impacts.

Stan directed the CCG for seven years until he had a stroke in 1999. His career as an academic was sadly cut short at the age of 55.

In 2012 at the GISRUK conference in Lancaster a special session was arranged to celebrate Stan's career.

== Education ==
- PhD, Geography, Newcastle University, 1974
- B.A. (first class) honours degree, Geography, Newcastle University, 1968
- Openshaw was a pupil at Argyle House School in Sunderland

== Scholarship ==
Openshaw made many contributions as a scholar nurturing and inspiring others. His research interests were broad and his work spanned urban morphology, regional planning, nuclear power, epidemiology, demography, geodemographics and environmental change impacts. Stan strove to remove human bias from the scientific process and was a strong believer in human-competitive machine intelligence. He innovated the use of genetic programming, artificial neural networks and fuzzy inference techniques in geography.

In the 1980s, Stan explored the Modifiable Areal Unit Problem (MAUP) as a source of statistical bias that can significantly impact the results of statistical hypothesis tests. His work on this topic led Mike Goodchild to suggest it be referred to as the "Openshaw effect".

Openshaw became a fellow of the Institute of Statisticians and a member of the British Computer Society in 1983, and a fellow of the Royal Geographical Society and a Chartered Statistician in 1993.

Stan invented new spatial analysis methods for identifying geographical clusters and developing geographical models.

He contributed to the field of geodemographics, working on the classification of individuals and groups of people.

He shaped computational geography as a subject, which he termed GeoComputation by editing a book on the subject and instigating an international GeoComputation Conference Series first hosted at the University of Leeds in 1996.

== Publications ==
Openshaw authored books, peer-reviewed journal articles, editorials and opinion pieces, book reviews and web sites.

Books:

- Openshaw, S., Abrahart, R.J., See, L.M., (eds), 2000, Geocomputation. DOI:10.4324/9780203305805
- Openshaw, S., Turton, I. (1999) High performance computing and the art of parallel programming: An Introduction for Geographers, Social Scientists and Engineers DOI:10.4324/9780203981436
- Stillwell, J.C.H, Geertman S., Openshaw, S. (1999) Geographical information and planning. doi:10.1007/978-3-662-03954-0
- Openshaw, S., Openshaw, C. (1997) Artificial intelligence in geography. ISBN 978-0-471-96991-4
- Openshaw, S. (1995) Census users' handbook
- Openshaw, S., Carver, S., Fernie J. (1989) Britain's nuclear waste: siting and safety
- Openshaw, S. (1986) Nuclear power: siting and safety DOI:10.4324/9780429278419
- Openshaw, S., Steadman, P., Greene, O. (1983) Doomsday: Britain after nuclear attack

Theses:

- Openshaw (1973) Processes in urban morphology with special reference to South Shields. PhD Thesis submitted to Newcastle University and archived at the British Library as microfilm no. : D10191/74. An abstract of the thesis was reproduced on-line and captured by the Wayback Machine.
- Openshaw (1968) Southern – East Lothian. B.A. Honours Geography Thesis submitted to Newcastle University. It has six chapters describing the physical and socio-economic geography of the region in the south east of Scotland. It contains tables of data, maps, aerial and ground level photographs, diagrams, statistical analysis, description and details of two surveys carried out as part of the work (one about tourism and another about agriculture).

== PhD students ==
Name of Student	Year of Completion	Thesis Title	University Affiliation
James Macgill	2001	Applications of Artificial Life Technologies to Geography	School of Geography, University of Leeds
Young-Hoon Kim	2000	Intelligent location optimisations (ILOs) in GIS environments	School of Geography, University of Leeds
Linda See	1999	Fuzzy Logic Applications in Geography	School of Geography, University of Leeds
Gary Diplock	1996	The Application of Evolutionary Computing Techniques to Spatial Interaction Modelling	School of Geography, University of Leeds
Danny Dorling	1991	The Visualization of Spatial Structure	Department of Geography, University of Newcastle upon Tyne
Chris Brunsdon	1990	Spatial Analysis Techniques Applied to Local Crime Patterns	Department of Geography, University of Newcastle upon Tyne
Yannis Veneris	1985	The Informational Revolution, Cybernetics and Urban Modelling	School of Architectural Engineering, National Technical University of Athens, Greece
