= Richard Webber (disambiguation) =

Richard Webber is a fictional surgeon on Grey's Anatomy.

Richard Webber may also refer to:

- Rick Webber, fictional character on General Hospital
- Richard E. Webber, Major General in the United States Air Force
- E. Richard Webber (born 1942), United States federal judge
- Richard Webber, animator at Aardman Animations, voice of Shirley in Shaun the Sheep
- Richard Webber (demographer) (born 1947), demographer and software entrepreneur

== See also ==
- Richard Weber (disambiguation)
