= Richard Webber (demographer) =

Demographer

Professor Richard James Webber (born September 1947) is the inventor of the geodemographic classifications systems Acorn and Mosaic. He has been a visiting professor at University College London, King's College London, and Newcastle University. In 2014 he founded Webber Phillips with Trevor Phillips. He is a fellow of the Market Research Society and the Institute of Direct Marketing. In 2020 Webber and Phillips were appointed to advise Public Health England about the impact of the 2020 coronavirus pandemic on BAME people in the United Kingdom.
