= Mosaic (geodemography) =

System for geodemographic classification of households

Mosaic is Experian's system for geodemographic classification of households. It applies the principles of geodemography to consumer household and individual data collated from a number of government and commercial sources. The statistical development of the system was led by professor Richard Webber in association with Experian in the 1980s, and it has been regularly refreshed and reclassified since then, each based on more recent data from national censuses and other sources. Since its initial development in the UK, the Mosaic brand name has also been used to market separate products which classify other national consumers including most of Western Europe, USA, selected Asian regions and Australia.

The initial UK version was based at the postcode level, which would cover an average of 20 properties with the same code. More recent versions have been developed at the individual household level and offer more accurate classification based on specific characteristics of each household. The 2009 Mosaic UK version, for example, classified the UK population into 15 main socio-economic groups and, within this, 67 different types.

Professor Webber also developed the competing ACORN system with CACI. Both Mosaic and Acorn have found application outside their original purpose of direct marketing, including governmental estimates and forecasts, and it is regularly employed by life insurance companies and pension funds in the UK to assess longevity for pricing and reserving. Both are also used extensively in understanding local service users, although Mosaic's naming has proved to be controversial, leading Experian to introduce Mosaic Public Sector with more politically correct segment names.

== Mosaic 2004 Classification Groups and Types ==
In 2004 individuals in the UK were classified into 11 main groups and 61 distinct types. The classifications change over time and as of 2024, 15 summary groups and 66 detailed types are now used by Experian. These changes can be significant, such as group G representing 'Domestic Success' in 2024 as opposed to 'Municipal Dependency' in 2004.

Group	Distinct types	Percentage of UK Households	Typical names	Social Groups	Description	Media
Symbols of Success (A)	A01 Global Connections; A02 Cultural Leadership; A03 Corporate Chieftains; A04 Golden Empty Nesters; A05 Provincial Privilege; A06 High Technologists; A07 Semi-Rural Seclusion	9.62%	Rupert and Felicity	Upper Middle and Middle Middle class	This group represents the wealthiest 10% of people in the UK, set in their careers and with substantial equity and net worth. These people tend to be white British but with some Jewish, Indian and Chinese Minorities. Tends to contain older people advanced in their careers.	Internet, some TV
Happy Families (B)	B08 Just Moving In; B09 Fledgling Nurseries; B10 Upscale New Owners; B11 Families Making Good Middle Rung Families	10.76%	Darren and Joanne	Lower middle class and Middle middle class	Families from Middle England, focussed on children, home and career. tends to be in new suburbs in more prosperous areas of the UK, Mostly white with few minorities	Sky TV and internet
Suburban Comfort (C)	C20 Asian Enterprise	15.10 %	Geoffrey and Valerie	Lower Middle Class	People in comfortable homes in mature suburbs built between 1918 & 1970, moderate incomes. Includes Middle class Asian Enterprise	Internet, Daily Mail
Ties of Community (D)	D25 Town Centre Refuge	16.04 %	Lee and Norreen	Lower middle class and Skilled working class	People focussed on local communities, families concentrated near Industrial areas, Includes lower income Asians	The Mirror, The Sun
Urban Intelligence (E)		7.19 %	Ben and Chloe	Mixture of Middle classes	Young educated people in urban areas starting out in life, Includes significant minority presence and students	The Guardian, The Times, and internet
Welfare Borderline (F)		6.43 %	Joseph and Agnes	Working class and Poor	Poorest people in the UK, Urban with significant ethnic minority presence	The Sun, and high TV viewing
Municipal Dependency (G)		6.71%	Wayne and Leanne	Working class and Poor	Poor people in council houses and dependent on benefits, Mostly white British with few immigrants	The Sun, and high TV viewing
Blue Collar Enterprise (H)		11.01%	Dean and Mandy	Skilled Working Class	Enterprising rather than well educated, includes White Van Man, Few Ethnic minorities	The Sun, and high TV viewing
Twilight Subsistence (I)		3.88 %	Percy and Ada	Working class pensioners	Poorer pensioners in council houses, few ethnic minorities	The Sun, and high TV viewing
Grey Perspectives (J)		7.88%	Edgar and Constance	Middle Class pensioners	Pensioners in comfortable retirement and traditional values	Daily Telegraph, Daily Mail
Rural Isolation (K)	...last one is K61 Upland Hill Farmers	5.39%	Huw and Gwenda	Mixed	Rural People with relatively low incomes but high non liquid assets, traditional values, very few ethnic minorities	Internet, Radio 4
