= Fantasia Fair =

Week-long conference for cross-dressers, transgender, and gender questioning people

Fantasia Fair (also known as FanFair) is a week-long conference for cross-dressers, transgender and gender questioning people held every October in Provincetown, Massachusetts, a small Portuguese fishing village and largely gay and lesbian tourist village on the very tip of Cape Cod. This annual event is the longest-running transgender conference in the United States and it provides a week for attendees to experiment with gender-role identities and presentations in a safe and affirming community. The goal of the conference is to create a safe space in which crossdressers, transgender and transsexual people, and nonbinary-gendered people are accepted without judgement, can interact with their peers, and can advocate for their rights. In November 1980 the event was featured in an article by D. Keith Mano in Playboy magazine and has in ensuing years has continued to generate publicity.

At its inception in 1975, Fantasia Fair was ten days long and considered an event for heterosexual cross-dressers. Most of the programs focused on personal presentation, and the registration fee, which included housing, was expensive. By the 1990s, however, the nature of the attendees were more diverse, including trans men and trans women, cross-dressers, and genderqueer people of every sexual orientation. Reflecting this move toward inclusivity, the event's name has been changed to TransWeek. In October 2024, the event will celebrate its 50th anniversary.

Fantasia Fair's parent organization was the Outreach Institute for Gender Studies (originally the Human Outreach and Achievement Institute), founded in 1975. Since 2000 the parent organization has been Real Life Experiences, a nonprofit corporation which makes annual awards to transgender pioneers at a banquet held during the Fair.

Many Fantasia Fair events are open to the public for free or at low cost. These include six daily keynote addresses, a dinner with entertainment, and the Fantasia Fair Fashion and Follies shows. A number of scholarships are awarded annually.

Many documents regarding Fantasia Fair, from its inception until current day, are archived in the Rikki Swin Collection in the University of Victoria Transgender Archives, in the Joseph A. Labadie Collection at the University of Michigan in Ann Arbor, and online at the Digital Transgender Archive.

== Partners, Professionals and Allies ==
Fantasia Fair has always emphasized and supported the spouses, family members, and allies of transgender and other gender nonconforming people and considered them full partners in the event. Discounts have routinely been given to spouses and every year one or more helping professionals work with trans families, holding workshops in a program track specifically for those in relationships with trans and gender nonbinary people.

Fantasia Fair has always attracted and welcomed helping professionals, many of whom attend for many years. Many of the trans attendees are themselves helping professionals and bring specialized knowledge to the event. Professionals include speech and voice therapists, psychologists, psychiatrists, social workers, surgeons, academics in a variety of disciplines, and gender theorists.

== Events ==
Fantasia Fair offers "a myriad of events and activities" including luncheons, award banquets, daily keynote addresses, and a wealth of workshops on topics including dance, gender change, identity, community building, legal and medical issues, and pronoun usage. Workshops on cosmetics and consultations on hair, makeup, clothing, voice, and gender confirmation surgeries are offered for those who desire them. There is an evening fashion show and a Fantasia Fair Follies talent show, and opportunities for nightlife and outings like whale watching, dunes tours, and history walks. The Unitarian Universalist Meeting House of Provincetown holds a special trans-inclusive service on the last day of Fantasia Fair.

Conference attendees are encouraged to participate in as many activities as possible, but are under no obligation to attend all, or any of the offered events. Many of the events take place in the Crown and Anchor restaurant, bar, and nightclub, but Fantasia Fair encompasses the entire town. Attendees stay in a variety of small inns and bed & breakfast establishments and many rent apartments or houses. Workshops and lunches are held in a variety of locations.

== Promotion ==
In its early years, promotion of Fantasia Fair was, at times, difficult, due to the discriminatory attitude and laws surrounding transsexualism, transvestism, and transgenderism. Promotion was carried out in a number of ways: flyers were sent out, usually in the February before the Fair, which is held in October. Brochures were made available and mailed to homes of past participants, and newsletters were mailed out in April, June, and September. Ads and articles were posted in several publications. Fantasia Fair staff members spoke about the event in their addresses, lectures, and speaking engagements. Orientation lectures and meetings were also used for promotion. There were correspondence periods via mail during the reservation, inquiry, and registration periods, in which participants and potential participants could ask staff members questions. There was also a central bulletin board and message center. During the Fair, advertisements were posted in convenient locations throughout Provincetown. Lastly, one of the most important tools for communication and promotion was word of mouth, including conversations involving facts, rumors, and opinions about the Fair between participants.

Today, the Fantasia Fair maintains a website and a presence on social media. Brochures are distributed throughout the year. A colorful program book is issued to participants upon arrival, and a daily newsletter tracks last-minute changes to the complex schedule.

== Accommodations ==
In its earliest years, Fantasia Fair offered a choice of accommodation from three options: a motel close to the beach, a larger hotel, or small apartments. Accommodation was assigned on a first-come, first-served basis, and prices varied depending on choice of facility. The Boatslip Motor Inn was a motel located close to the beach, and west of Provincetown's downtown. It offered single rooms and an "excellent view of ocean scenery." The Crown and Anchor Motor Inn was a larger hotel in which many of the Fair's events took place. It's located in the downtown area on Commercial Street. The Crown and Anchor offered single, double rooms, and suites, all with private bath, as well as several facilities on-site such as a restaurant, a lounge, a dance club, and several small shops. The small apartments were in the Hargood Apartments, whicher were also located in the downtown area. Couples could book an apartment for a reduced rate. All apartments included a kitchenette, a separate bedroom, and a private bath.

Today Fantasia Fair utilizes a number of restaurants and inns and attendees stay in a variety of inns or rent houses or apartments for their week in Provincetown. The banquets and keynotes are held at the Crown and Anchor.

== History ==
=== 1975 ===
Fantasia Fair was founded by individuals such as Betsy Shaw, Ari Kane, Betty Ann Lind, and Linda Franklin, as well as other members of The Cherrystones, a transgender support group based out of Boston. The notion of a transgender conference stemmed from the founders' firm belief that there was a need for trans people of all sorts to learn about themselves, in order to feel less isolated in society because of their gender identity. Once Provincetown was selected as the official location of Fantasia Fair, the founders worked with female impersonators from the Massachusetts town, a few Cape Cod doctors, and some cosmetics consultants in order to establish the first Fantasia Fair. There were approximately 40 participants in the first year.

=== 1976 ===
The annual Fantasia Fair took place from October 15 to October 24 in 1976. Coordinated by Ari Kane, the 2nd annual Fair offered many events. These included fashion and beauty courses, the Ages of Fashion Ball, an awards banquet, a film festival, a fashion show, the Foundation Boutique, a volleyball game, and exhibits and displays. In addition to these events, the 1976 conference was the first to offer a course specifically for the wives and girlfriends of transgender and transsexual participants in the Fair. These seminars were for the purpose of fostering healthy relationships between partners, and for the growth of understanding and support. The 1976 Fair was also the first to offer job opportunities as "Femmes in Provincetown," at frequent requests of participants.

=== 1977 ===
The 3rd annual Fantasia Fair took place from October 15 to 23 in 1977. Each event began at 9:30 every morning and lasted for an hour. Any demonstration was an additional $35 on top of the original fee. The coordinator for the 1977 Fair was Nancy Ledins. Registration for the 9-day-long event started at 2:00 pm on Friday the 15th. Approximately 100 individuals took part in the 1977 Fantasia Fair, and around two-thirds of them stayed for the entire nine-day period. The events in 1977 were similar to those of the 1976 Fantasia Fair. The Fashion Beauty course was offered every morning of the Fair. Paula Nielson was the coordinator of the Fashion and Beauty segment of the Fair. The body movement courses included assistance on the improvement of "femme comportment" in walking, talking, sitting, dining, and dancing. On the last Friday of the Fair, a potluck dinner in the Unitarian Church following a symposium on transgenderism and the trans community. In the annual awards ceremony, awards given included best in Congeniality, Best Dressed, and the Cinderella Award. New awards were included as well, including Miss Femininity and Miss Fantasia Fair.

=== 1978 ===
The 4th annual Fantasia Fair took place from October 13 to the 22nd. The coordinator of the 1978 Fantasia Fair was Nancy Ledins. Virginia Prince considered attending the Fair in 1978, and was a frequent attendee in later years.

=== 1999 ===
The dates of the 25th Silver Jubilee Fantasia Fair were October 17 through 24. The Angela Ochoa Best-Dressed and Femininity awards were retired.

=== 2001 ===
At the conclusion of Fantasia Fair 2000, stewardship of Fantasia Fair was transferred from the nonprofit Outreach Institute for Gender Studies to the nonprofit Real Life Experiences. Special events in 2001 included a screening of the film Southern Comfort, an art gallery walk, and high tea and a photo exhibit by Mariette Pathy Allen at the Provincetown Art Association Museum. The dates of the 2001 Fantasia Fair were October 14–21. Dallas Denny was Fair Director.

=== 2002 ===
Fantasia Fair 2001 began on October 20 and ended on October 27 and saw the first Transgender Pioneer awards banquet. Pioneer awards were given to Virginia Prince and Merissa Sherrill Lynn for their decades of work on behalf of the transgender community. Dallas Denny was again Fair Director.

=== 2004 ===
Program Director Miqqi Alicia Gilbert used six keynote slots to create The Trans-Progressive Symposium. Symposium speakers were Susan Stryker, Dallas Denny, Miqqi Alicia Gilbert, Jamison Green, and Miilton Diamond. Keynote presentations were open to the public. On Monday night there was a preview of Stryker's film Screaming Queens: The Riot at Compton's Cafeteria. Dates for the 2004 Fantasia Fair were October 17 through October 24.

=== 2008 ===
The dates of Fantasia Fair 2008 were October 19 through October 26. The Femininity Award was retired.

=== 2015 ===
The 41st annual Fantasia Fair was held from October 18, 2015, to October 25, 2015. The coordinator was Barbara Curry, with help from past Fair directors. Many events remain the same as they were in 1975, such as Awards Banquet, now called The Virginia Prince Transgender Pioneer Awards Banquet, the film festival, the fashion show, as well as the Ball, and the Gala Awards Banquet. The seminars, workshops, and talks have evolved a lot since 1975. Many of the talks and workshops addressed issues surrounding the politics of transgender people, such as hate crimes by the federal government about trans people, self-defense courses, and the issue of gendered washrooms as well as the medical aspect of transition such as workshops addressing the biopsychology of trans people, hormone management, gender change surgical options, post-surgery realities, and hair removal education. Many traditional-style workshops still were offered as well, such as seminars addressing wig styling, feminizing the voice, and makeup and image consultations.

Fantasia Fair Directors have included Nancy Ledins, Ariadne Kane, Betty Ann Lind, Alison Laing, Dottie Laing, Pamela Geddes, Dallas Denny, Miqqi Alicia Gilbert, Barbara Curry, and Jamie Dailey. Dee LaValle was named Fair Director in 2018.

== The Human Outreach and Achievement Institute ==
The Human Outreach and Achievement Institute was established in 1975 in Boston as a way to increase awareness and participation in the Fantasia Fair conference, as well as to function as a support and information centre for members of the Trans Community. The main goal of the nonprofit institute is to develop and foster understanding of human sexuality, in order to combat ignorance and misinformation. Ariadne Kane both founded the institute with help from other individuals such as Sandy Mesics, and directed it for a number of years. The Human Outreach and Achievement Institute helped to develop several programs to achieve their goal of education and training for professionals. These programs included conferences, informational seminars, and workshops. The programs were directed at people from relevant professions in fields such as education, guidance and counseling, therapy, law, law enforcement, nursing, and human services. The Outreach Institute also offered special programs surrounding gender issues and androgyny. Many of the programs are directed at communities of crossdressers, transsexuals, and androgyns. In addition to these programs, the Human Outreach and Achievement Institute published books and pamphlets with information regarding masculinity, transvestism, socio-cultural contexts of crossdressing, and abstracts of symposiums on gender studies and other issues. The first training session for professionals occurred in March 1977. The institute received correspondence from all over the United States, as well as Canada. In 1980, the organization received significant media coverage on a Phil Donahue episode, which was viewed by more than 8 million people, where Ariadne Kane spoke about gender fluidity and took questions from the audience. The institute also sent out newsletters called Swan which included editorials, letters to the editor, book recommendations, and shopping recommendations specifically for the safety and comfort of trans people. There were also sections on Trans community news, politics, interviews, calls to assist in the Outreach program, as well as special offers and deals specifically for people in the trans community.

== Real Life Experiences ==
Real Life Experiences is a nonprofit 401(c)(4) corporation which was founded in 2000 to serve as the parent nonprofit for Fantasia Fair. At an annual banquet held at Fantasia Fair, RLE presents Virginia Prince Transgender Pioneer Awards to one or more individuals who have worked selflessly on behalf of the transgender and gender nonconforming community.

== See also ==
- List of LGBT events
