= Audience segmentation =

Process of dividing people into subgroups

Audience segmentation is a process of dividing people into homogeneous subgroups based upon defined criteria such as product usage, demographics, psychographics, communication behaviors and media use.

== Definition ==
Audience segmentation is used in commercial marketing so advertisers can design and tailor products and services that satisfy the targeted groups. In social marketing, audiences are segmented into subgroups and assumed to have similar interests, needs and behavioral patterns and this assumption allows social marketers to design relevant health or social messages that influence people to adopt recommended behaviors. Audience segmentation is widely accepted as a fundamental strategy in communication campaigns to influence health and social change. Audience segmentation makes campaign efforts more effective when messages are tailored to the distinct subgroups and more efficient when the target audience is selected based on their susceptibility and receptivity.

== Criteria for audience segmentation strategy ==
Audience segmentation strategy is driven by the goal of developing criteria that can be used to form homogeneous clusters. The most common criteria used are demographics (age, level of education, income, ethnicity and gender) and geography (region, county, census tract). Since an audience segment that is derived exclusively from demographics such as Asian-American youths constitutes a large group that still has varied beliefs, values and behavior, demographics may not be sufficient as segmentation criteria. More sophisticated segmentation strategies use psychosocial, behavioral and psychographics (personality, values, attitudes, interests, level of readiness for change and lifestyles) as variables to categorize audience subgroups. Once the audience has been divided into segments based on selected criteria, campaigns are then designed and communication channels are selected to reach their intended audience effectively.

=== Grunig's model of segmentation ===
Grunig proposed a theory-based model of segmentation which comprises a series of inner and outer nests. The inner nests contain (a) individuals (individual communication behaviors and effects) and (b) publics (groups of people sharing common interests and issues). The outer nests consist of (c) communities, (d) psychographics, lifestyles and subcultures, and social relationships, (e) geodemographics, (f) demographics/social categories and (g) mass audience. The nests display increasing specificity instead of generality as they move towards the inner center; more specificity provides more audience details and insights that allow communication campaigns to create more precise messages for the target audience.

== Ethical issues ==
Audience segmentation is employed in health interventions as a strategy to effectively utilize limited resources to reach the intended population. Equity and utility are often the prominent ethical issues in audience segmentation. Some campaigns target people who are most inclined to accept suggested messages while other campaigns aim at those with higher risks, despite the fact that they are hard to reach or least likely to adopt recommended behavior. Ethical dilemma occurs when health communicators have to identify audience segments and plan health interventions for these groups, depriving those not targeted in the process.

Public health campaigns often target large segments of population who have low to moderate risk as small changes can create visible impact on morbidity and mortality. Health campaigns aim to decrease alcoholic beverage consumption focus on moderate users who are larger in number and have higher likelihood to respond positively to the interventions. On the other hand, targeting small segments of the high-risk population (e.g. heavy smokers) in quit smoking campaigns may be inefficient as they are less likely to stop the risky behavior.

Audience segmentation can also cause conflicts within the community. The Nigeria STD/HIV Management Project, funded by the UK Department of International Development (DFID) in 1999, stirred intense conflicts after non-targeted community members felt resources had been unfairly allocated to the "unworthy" audience segment: people living with HIV/AIDS. As a result, people living with HIV were turned away from attending health centers, excluded and discriminated by the community, and 25 people with HIV/AIDS in the project eventually died by the end of 2000.

== Use in international health campaigns ==
Slater and Flora's 1991 study on the risk of cardiovascular disease among central Californians utilized health behaviors to segment the audience into seven subgroups. The health behaviors criteria included (a) cognitive (health knowledge, attitudes, issue involvement, perceived response efficacy, perceived risk, and perceived self-efficacy); (b) social influence (community, reference group and family norms, expectations from family and friends, and social visibility of behavior); and (c) individual norms obtained from personal history. The study yielded two distinctive subgroups, despite their demographic similarities (White and middle socioeconomic status). The group with moderate level of good diets and physical activity and low tobacco consumption was more likely to seek health information and believed that cardiovascular disease was preventable by changing their health behavior. On the other hand, the group with poor diets, high level of alcohol and tobacco consumption and high perception of susceptibility to cardiovascular disease did not plan to mitigate those risks and refrained from seeking health information. The disparities between these two segments were crucial for health communicators to design and tailor different messages to influence their health behaviors.

Rimal, Brown, Mkandawire, Folda, Bose and Creel identified risk perceptions and efficacy beliefs as the main audience segmentation criteria for the HIV-prevention project in Malawi. Four subgroups created were responsive (high risk, high efficacy), avoidance (high risk, low efficacy), proactive (low risk, high efficacy) and indifference (low risk, low efficacy). The study found different levels of HIV knowledge, HIV testing and condom use among the four segments. Responsive and proactive groups were most responsive to preventive behaviors whereas avoidance and indifference groups were less inclined to practice preventive behaviors. Audience segmentation could be utilized in Malawi to target different segments with tailored messages in risk perceptions and efficacy beliefs in order to influence them to adopt recommended HIV-prevention behaviors.

== See also ==
- Demographics
- Geodemography
- Market segmentation
- Psychographic
- Social marketing
