= Crucible (disambiguation) =

A crucible is a heat-resistant container in which materials can be heated to very high temperatures.

Crucible may also refer to:

== Literature, drama, and film ==
- The Crucible, a 1953 play by Arthur Miller about the Salem witch trials
  - The Crucible (1957 film) (French: Les Sorcières de Salem), a film with a screenplay by Jean-Paul Sartre based on Miller's play
  - The Crucible (1996 film), a film directed by Nicholas Hytner written by Miller based on his play
  - The Crucible (opera), a 1961 opera by Robert Ward based on Miller's play
- The Crucible (1914 film), a silent film starring Marguerite Clark, based on novel by Mark Lee Luther
- The Crucible (novel), a 2009 novel by Gong Ji-Young
  - The Crucible (2011 film), a South Korean film
- The Crucible (trilogy), a series of novels by Sara Douglass
- Crucible (Rollins novel), a 2019 novel by James Rollins
- Crucible (Denning novel), a 2013 Star Wars novel by Troy Denning
- Crucible: The Trial of Cyric the Mad, the fifth novel of The Avatar Series
- Crucible, a planet in the novel On the Steel Breeze

== Music ==
- Crucible (album), a 2002 album by Halford
- The Crucible (John Zorn album), 2008
- Crucible (2013 tribute album), music of the Hunters & Collectors
- The Crucible (Motorpsycho album), 2019

== Television ==
- "Crucible" (Arrow), an episode of Arrow
- "The Crucible" (Frasier), an episode of Frasier
- "The Crucible", an episode of the documentary series Canada: A People's History

== Video games ==
- Crucible (video game), a free-to-play multiplayer third-person shooter
- Crucible, an expansion of Eve Online
- Crucible, a cancelled game by Maxis South
- "Crucible", a minigame in Fable II
- The Crucible, a fictional alien device in Mass Effect 3
- Crucible, the name of a competitive PvP multiplayer activity in Destiny
- The Crucible, a fictional sword featured in Doom Eternal

== Other uses ==
- Crucible Industries, the US steel manufacture that produces CPM steels
- Crucible, Pennsylvania, United States
- Crucible (software), a peer code review application from Atlassian, Inc.
- Crucible (geodemography), a geodemography system by the grocery company Tesco
- Crucible Theatre, Sheffield, England
- The Crucible (arts education center), a non-profit industrial arts studio in Oakland, California, US
- The Crucible (UNC Student Publication), a student newspaper at the University of Northern Colorado
- The Crucible, the final test in United States Marine Corps Recruit Training
- World Snooker Championship, hosted annually at the Crucible Theatre (see above), commonly referred to as "the Crucible"
