= Country commercial guides =

Reports from the United States Commercial Service

Country Commercial Guides
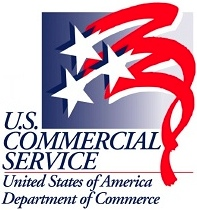
- Author(s): United States Commercial Service
- Purpose: Economic & Political Environment; Leading Sectors for U.S. Export and Investment; Trade regulations, customs and standards; Investment climate; Business travel

The Country Commercial Guides (CCG) are reports, prepared by United States Commercial Service offices around the world, which provide comprehensive commercial information for U.S. companies looking to do business in a specific country.

== Contents ==
The type of information you will find includes:

- Economic & Political Environment
- Leading Sectors for U.S. Export and Investment
- Trade regulations, customs and standards
- Investment climate
- Business travel
