= Ari Kane =

American crossdresser, activist, and educator

- Born: 1936 (age 89–90)
- Education: City College of New York; New York University; University at Buffalo; Institute for the Advanced Study of Human Sexuality

Ariadne "Ari" Kane is a crossdresser, activist, educator, and one of the founders of the Fantasia Fair. She runs Theseus Counseling Services which specializes in gender issues and remains open currently in Cambridge, Massachusetts.

Kane is nonbinary, specifically "androgyne-bigender." Kane is also bisexual.

== Biography ==
Ariadne "Ari" Kane was born in 1936. Kane is of Greek descent and grew up in New York City. In 1958, Kane completed a Bachelor of Science in biophysics, Mathematics and Chemistry at City College of New York, and undertook graduate work in Biophysics at New York University and University at Buffalo. Additionally, Kane holds a doctorate of education from Institute for Advanced Study of Sexuality and is an assistant professor of sexology at the Institute for the Advanced Study of Human Sexuality in San Francisco. Kane has lectured at many major universities, such as the Harvard School of Medicine, the Boston University School of Social Work, University of New Hampshire School of Medicine, and the University of Vermont.

Kane also runs Theseus Counselling Services which specializes in providing counselling services to individuals impacted by gender issues, such as preoperative and postoperative transsexuals, couples impacted by gender variance, and individuals with gender dysphoria. Kane's practice is still operating in Cambridge, Massachusetts.

Kane "came out" about her gender and sexuality in 1971 after she developed close relationships with transvestites. She oversaw the restructuring and relocation of the cross dressing support group, the Boston Gamma chapter of Tri-Sigma (later the Tiffany Club, the Cherrystone Club, then the Mayflower Club). In 1975 Kane founded the Human Outreach and Achievement Institute (later named the Outreach Institute for Gender Studies), an organization dedicated to public education and to working with the health professionals who serve the community.

Through the institute, Kane has been tireless in efforts to educate mental health professionals. Kane has given informative seminars at the annual meetings of the Society for the Scientific Study of Sexuality, the Association for Humanistic Psychology, the American Society for Criminal Justice Professionals, the American Society of Sociology, and the American Association of Sex Educators, Counselors and Therapists. In 1978, 1979, and 1980 the Institute organized international conferences focused exclusively on the social, medical, and legal aspects of transgender behavior. Kane has presented on transgender issues in classrooms at the undergraduate and graduate levels in the departments of nursing, medicine, criminal justice, psychology, and sociology at Harvard, Boston University, and elsewhere. Kane also contributed when the Harry Benjamin Standards of Care for Transsexuals were first written in 1978.

In 1975, Kane co-founded Fantasia Fair, with Betty-Ann Lind and other members of the Cherrystone Club. It was originally an annual gathering for the Cross-dressing men, their partners, and medical and other professionals working with the Transgender and Transsexual community. Fantasia Fair now welcomes Trans men.

On the foundation of the event, Kane says:

Fan/Fair (the abbreviated version) was conceived of in 1974. It struck me that we could create a dynamic program of activities that were educational, social and practical for all CDs [Crossdressers] & TSs [Transsexuals] who were willing to come out from the "closets" of shame, guilt and shyness. I believed that, in a tolerant and open community, they could learn some things about being femme or masculine; get much needed help about comportment and presentation and, have truly educational experience out of the "closet". It was with this guiding premise that Fan/Fair was created. It was with the help and financial backing of 3 members of the Boston Cherrystone Club and myself that Fan/Fair 1 became a reality in 1975.

== Publications ==
Kane published a book called Crossing Sexual Boundaries: Transgender Journeys, Uncharted Paths in 2005 as "J. Ari Kane-Demaios," in conjunction with Vern Bullough. The book is a collection of autobiographies of Trans-people, many of whom have made major impact on the growth and recognition of the Transgender Phenomenon as a positive, viable lifestyle during their lives. “We tried to involve contributors from all sectors of the gender spectrum, including androgynes, non operative and post-operative, individuals, spouses and close friends of T people” but the editors carefully restricted the sample to middle-class white persons, and, with only one exception, to US citizens, and excluded sex workers and any who had a male spouse.

Kane also served as the editor of The Journal of Gender Studies, the official publication of the Human Outreach and Achievement Institute and the editor of Outreach Newsletter, the official publication of the Human Outreach and Achievement Institute.

Information on Kane (including Kane's personal correspondences), and on the Fantasia Fair are available through the Rikki Swin collection of The Transgender Archives at the University of Victoria and through the Digital Transgender Archive.

== See also ==
- List of people with non-binary gender identities
