= Richard Weber =

Richard Weber may refer to:

- Richard Weber (explorer) (born 1959), Canadian Arctic and polar adventurer
- Richard Weber (mathematician) (born 1953), English mathematician
- Richard Weber (poet) (1932–2020), Irish poet
- Richard Weber (public servant), former US IRS-CI Chief

== See also ==
- Richard Webber (disambiguation)
- Dick Weber (1929–2005), American ten-pin bowler
