= Centre for Computational Geography =

Research centre at the University of Leeds

The Centre for Computational Geography (CCG) is an inter-disciplinary research centre based at the University of Leeds. The CCG was founded in 1993 by Stan Openshaw and Phil Rees, and builds on more than 40 years of experience in spatial analysis and modelling within the School of Geography. CCG research is concerned with the development and application of tools for the analysis, visualisation and modelling of geographical systems.
