= Trade regulation =

Field of law dealing with competition between businesses

Trade regulation is a field of law, often bracketed with antitrust (as in the phrase “antitrust and trade regulation law”), including government regulation of unfair methods of competition and unfair or deceptive business acts or practices. Antitrust law is often considered a subset of trade regulation law. Franchise and distribution law, consumer protection law, and advertising law are sometimes considered parts of trade regulation law.

== See also ==
- Cornell University — Supreme Court opinions on trade regulation
- FTC Consumer Protection Bureau
- LexisOne — sources of information about antitrust and trade regulation law
- Sample of Trade Regulation Talk blog.
