= Manifold Data Mining Inc. =

Canadian data analytics company

Manifold Data Mining Inc. is a Canadian company specializing in consumer data products, analytics, and predictive modeling. As a data and analytical service provider in Canada, they have been providing businesses, charities, and governmental organizations with comprehensive data products since being founded in 2001. For each neighbourhood, they provide estimates of what products consumers buy, where and how often they shop, how much they spend, which media channels they use, their lifestyles, and their attitudes or psychographics.

== Data products ==
Their data products include demographics (e.g. geo-demographics), consumer behaviour, and a number of other categories. The Canadian census is conducted every 5 years, so in order to produce inter-censal estimates, e.g. for Sault Ste. Marie, they need to take into consideration other factors. They also consider factors which affect the standard census such as undercount.

All data products are modelled down to the 6-digit postal code level and various levels of census geographic units, with each postal code averaging 10–15 households.

Manifold is a partner of Vividata and Numeris, and models their survey responses down to the 6-digit postal code level, i.e. all across Canada and in markets not covered by their surveys.

Manifold Data Mining Inc.
- Industry: Marketing; Customer analytics
- Founded: 2001 in Toronto, Ontario
- Headquarters: Toronto, Ontario, Canada
- Products: CanaCode Lifestyle Clusters; SuperDemographics; Household Spending; Household Wealth and Assets

== CanaCode lifestyle clusters ==
One of their popular data products is CanaCode Lifestyles, which is a lifestyle segmentation system based on over 10,000 variables, ranging from demographic to spending to consumer behaviour and media usage patterns.

== Scientific research ==
Manifold Data Mining has also published numerous peer-reviewed research papers on topics such as Type 2 Diabetes. Manifold also publishes papers on Machine Learning techniques like collaborative filtering, which they use in their modelling and as part of their proprietary techniques.

== Other usage ==
Manifold is often cited by municipalities in their community profiles, 5 and 10 year economic and land development plans.

Manifold's data has been used by university researchers, for example those investigating poverty odds, living standards, and low socio-economic status.
