= Crucible (geodemography) =

Crucible is a geodemography computer system created by the United Kingdom-based grocery company Tesco. The system is run by a subsidiary Dunnhumby. The system collects information from the company's loyalty program, "Clubcard", as well as aggregating information from other geodemographic databases and other sources. The system has been used to sell customer information to other companies in the UK, leading to accusations in 2005 that the company, with its large share of the UK shopping sector, has become too powerful.
