= Community-controlled game =

Video game genre

A community-controlled game (CCG) is any video game featuring a single avatar that is controlled by more than one person. As the definition of a CCG refers to the way a game is played, rather than aspects of the game itself, a CCG can be played in any genre. A CCG will intake commands from multiple players and will issue them to the avatar. However, as players cannot predict what other players will input, the movements and actions of the avatar can be incredibly erratic depending on the game's input mode.

== Styles of play ==
=== Anarchy ===
Anarchy-mode allows all commands by players to be issued in sequential order to the avatar. This method of gameplay allows all individuals the equal ability to influence the movement or actions of the avatar, but none the ability to control it with strategy or rationale. Anarchy-mode is very susceptible to Trolls, which makes narrative progress difficult with this style of gameplay. However, players of anarchy-based CCGs often play for the communal experience, rather than the game's story. These players will often collectively create a new narrative based on their unpredictable gameplay.

=== Democracy ===
Democracy-mode allows all commands within a set period of time to be collected, counted and subject to the majority rule. This method of gameplay will issue only the command that is voted for the most (within each block of time), allowing strategy and methodology to be used. While democracy-mode is effective in allowing narrative progress, it often requires planning, voting and agreement between the majority. Unlike anarchy-mode, democracy-mode is protected well against Trolls, unless the majority is made up of them.

== Current examples ==
=== Twitch Plays Pokémon ===
On 12 February 2014, an anonymous programmer from Australia streamed a game of Pokémon Red onto the video game live streaming website Twitch. Rather than passively watching the streamer play, viewers of Twitch Plays Pokémon were able to actively participate by typing commands into the stream's chatbox. While the original Pokémon Red was a single-player role-playing game, the use of the streamer's code allowed the game to be re-mediated into a CCG. Community-controlled games may exist as either a remediated single-player game or as a game designed to be played by a community.

== Categories of CCGs ==
=== Remediations ===
Currently, most CCGs exist as remediations of single-player games. To convert a single-player game into a CCG, the only requirement is for the controls to be opened up to multiple players. A remediation features changes solely to the gameplay mechanics, leaving everything else unchanged.

=== Dedicated CCGs ===
A dedicated CCG is a game made specifically to be a community-controlled game. These games will be developed with an awareness of their audience, and the narration will address the community as a whole during tutorials or throughout the game. These games will either feature a third-person plural narrative, or what Game Theorist Chris Milando calls a fourth-person narrative.
