= Castor Cracking Group =

Swedish demo group

Screenshot of Castor Intro 2

Castor Cracking Group (CCG) was a demo group from Sweden, and were active on the ZX Spectrum during 1986–1988. They were one of the first groups for the ZX Spectrum with their release of Castor Intro early in 1986.

Originally they named themselves after Castor in the constellation Gemini, but despite having "Crack" in their name, they actually (at least according to themselves) never cracked any software.

Technically, their demos were not very advanced – they even programmed many of them in BASIC and compiled the result for release. However, their significance lies in their early entry onto the scene.

== UK Lead ==
UK Lead was a label used by Castor Cracking Group for the more "serious" projects. The only two projects released were Spectrum Juggler and 99Y.

== Members ==
- Staffan "Cobra" Vilcans (later "Ralph 124C41+")
- Martin "DoWN" Vilcans (the Dragon of Winter Night (earlier "Marulk"))
- Johan "Heradotos" Forslund (C64)

== List of demos ==
=== Demos ===
- Castor Intro (1986)
- Castor Intro 2 - Trap Door (1987)
- Castor Intro 3 - Ocean (1987)
- Castor Intro 4 - Balls (1987)
- Castor Intro 5 - Boing Boomchack (1987)
- Castor Intro 6 - Monster Banquet (1987)
- Castor Intro 7 - never made
- Castor Intro 8 - Dan There (1987)
- Castor Intro 9 - Move That Army (1987)
- Castor Intro 10 - Auf Wiedersehen Castor (1988)
- Spectrum Juggler (1987) (under the name UK Lead).

=== Music demos ===
- Don't Stop the Music (1987)
- 128 Demo
- 128 Music (1987)
- 128 Music II (1987)

=== Games ===
- 99Y - http://zx.interface1.net/99y.html (under the name UK Lead)
