= County Ground =

There are several stadiums in England called the County Ground:

- Bristol County Ground – home of Gloucestershire CCC
- County Cricket Ground, Chelmsford – home of Essex CCC
- County Ground, Derby – home of Derbyshire CCC
- County Ground, Durham (better known as the Riverside Ground) – home of Durham CCC
- County Ground, Edgbaston, Birmingham (better known as Edgbaston) – home of Warwickshire CCC
- County Ground Stadium, Exeter – the former home of Exeter Chiefs rugby union club
- County Ground, Exeter, also in Exeter and used for Devon CCC home matches
- County Cricket Ground, Hove – home of Sussex CCC
- County Cricket Ground, Northampton (also known as Wantage Road), – home of Northamptonshire CCC and former home of Northampton Town F.C.
- County Ground, Southampton – former home of Hampshire CCC
- County Ground, Stoke-on-Trent - former home Staffordshire CCC
- County Ground (Swindon) – home of Swindon Town F.C.
- County Cricket Ground, Swindon - former home of Wiltshire CCC
- County Ground, Taunton – home of Somerset CCC
- County Ground, New Road, Worcester (better known as New Road) – home of Worcestershire CCC
- County Cricket Ground, Beckenham, a cricket ground in Beckenham, England
- County Ground, Lakenham, in Lakenham, Norwich, Norfolk
- County Ground, Leyland, a football stadium in Leyland, Lancashire
- County Ground, Leyton
- County Ground, Old Trafford
