= Geodemography =

Geodemography is the study of people based on where they live. It links the sciences of demography, the study of human population dynamics, and geography, the study of the locational and spatial variation of both physical and human phenomena on Earth, along with sociology. It includes the application of geodemographic classifications for business, social research and public policy but has a parallel history in academic research seeking to understand the processes by which settlements (notably, cities) evolve and neighborhoods are formed. Geodemographic systems estimate the most probable characteristics of people based on the pooled profile of all people living in a small area near a particular address.

== Origins ==
The origins of geodemographics are often identified as Charles Booth and his studies of deprivation and poverty in early twentieth century London, and the Chicago School of sociology. Booth developed the idea of 'classifying neighborhoods', exemplified by his multivariate classification of the 1891 UK Census data to create a generalized social index of London's (then) registration districts. Research at the Chicago School – though generally qualitative in nature – strengthened the idea that such classifications could be meaningful by developing the idea of 'natural areas' within cities: conceived as geographical units with populations of broadly homogenous social-economic and cultural characteristics.

The idea that census outputs could serve to identify and to characterize the geographies of cities gathered momentum with the increased availability of national census data and the computational ability to look for patterns in such data. Of particular importance to the emerging geodemographic industry was the development of clustering techniques to group statistically similar neighborhoods into classes on a 'like with like' basis. More recently, data has become available at finer geographical resolutions (such as postal units), often originating from private commercial (i.e. non-governmental) sources.

Commercial geodemographics emerged from the late 1970s with the launch of PRIZM by Claritas in the US and Acorn by CACI in the UK. Geodemography has been used to target consumer services to 'ideal' populations based on their lifestyle and location. These parameters have been taken from geographical databases as well as from electoral lists and credit agencies. Combining these builds a picture of the population characteristics in different locations. The geodemographic data that this provides can then be used by marketers to target information towards those that they want to influence. This can be in the form of sales, services, or even political information. At heart, geodemographics is just a structured method of making sense of complex socio-economic datasets.

== In the UK ==
In 2005 the Office for National Statistics (ONS) in collaboration with Dan Vickers and Phil Rees of the University of Leeds, released a free small scale social area classification of the UK based on 2001 UK small area census data. Similar classifications had been developed for earlier censuses, notably by Stan Openshaw and colleagues at Newcastle and Leeds Universities, but access to these generally was restricted to the academic communities.

The 2005 Output Area Classification (OAC) and the 2013 release of Acorn in the UK is a move to 'open geodemographics' and reflects a concern that applications of commercial geodemographics in policy and social research can otherwise be 'black box'. It is not always clear exactly what variables were used to classify small areas and to define their neighbourhood type, how those variables were weighted, or how similar (or otherwise) each of the neighbourhoods within a class type actually are. Open geodemographics provides such information (because it is not constrained by commercial interests) and is an important development for applied social research that also seeks to understand and to explain the roots causes or processes that generate aggregate spatial patterns of social behaviour and attitudes. The Output Area Classification is now supported by a user group here. CACI have also released detailed documentation on how their classification utilizes Open Data here.

Geodemographic profiles have widened their application in the UK. Many UK life insurance companies and pension funds using them to assess longevity for pricing and reserving.

== In Australia ==
In Australia, general purpose geodemographic systems summarises a broad range of profiling data, largely derived from the Australian Census to create a thumbnail sketch of the type of people living in a particular small area. These small areas are either CCD (Census Collection District) or a sub-CD area, like a Meshblock.

The types of characteristics mainly taken into account in geodemographic system construction are:

- Age distribution;
- Socioeconomic status indicators like income, education, and occupational status;
- Household and family composition;
- Cultural factors, such as ethnicity, language spoken, country of birth, and (but not limited to) religion;
- Employment factors, such as type of job, type of industry, and hours of work;
- Household economic factors, like indebtedness, investments, and poverty;
- Consumer behavior, like household expenditures;
- Regional factors (e.g. whether the resided area is classified as metropolitan, provincial, or sparsely settled), and;
- Residential stability.

In 1987, geodemographic systems were first introduced as social analysis tools with CCN's (later Experian) introduction of the MOSAIC system. In 1990, RDA Research built their first system, geoSmart.

== Criticisms ==
Geodemographics has drawn critical attention. Some focus on the possible discriminatory and intrusive effects of geodemographic practices. Others wonder whether members of geodemographic groups really are sufficiently alike to be analysed together. The generally unknown variance within geodemographic groupings makes it difficult to assess the significance of trends found in data. This may not matter for commercial and service planning applications but is of some concern for public sector and social research. Others wonder if geography is the best way to group people together, e.g. if there is a retirement home next to a student residence, geography alone will not give the right answers. A way forward is to integrate geodemographics with more statistical frameworks of analysis, for example, using multilevel methods.

== Commercial demography systems ==
- PRIZM by Claritas
- CanaCode Lifestyle Clusters by Manifold Data Mining
- CAMEO by Callcredit
- Censation by AFD Software
- Acorn by CACI
- OAC by ONS/University of Leeds
- CLOUD CLIENT by Cloud Client Ltd
- C-Australia by Pathfinder Solutions
- C-New Zealand by Pathfinder Solutions
- C-Japan by Pathfinder Solutions
- Mosaic by Experian
- MicroVision by NDS/Equifax
- Crucible by Tesco
- geoSmart by RDA Research
- HomeTypes and ZoneTypes by Arvato Services (Bertlsmann)
- P^{2} People & Places by Beacon Dodsworth
- NuMaps by DemographicDrapes

== See also ==
- Demography
- Geodemographic segmentation
