= Acorn (demographics) =

Geodemographic information system categorising some UK postcodes

The Acorn structure

Acorn, developed by CACI Limited in London, is a segmentation tool which categorises the United Kingdom's population into demographic types. It has been built by analysing social factors and behaviour. Acorn segments households, postcodes and neighbourhoods into six categories, 18 groups and 62 types.

== Methodology ==
In March 2013, CACI launched the latest version of Acorn, although the necessary data from the 2011 census was not available for the whole of the UK. The current version of Acorn does not rely on census data, but uses the new data environment created by government policies on Open data and the availability of a number of brand new private sector datasets. Peter Sleight, Chair of the Association of Census Distributors, considered Acorn's new version a sufficient improvement to have "revolutionised geodemographics". At The Census & Geodemographics Group's decennial conference, Tracking a Decade of Changing Britain, CACI presented a paper on the demographic segmentation.

CACI refrained from the traditional method, starting by separating the definition of the types from the assignment of postcodes to the types, allowing them to be assigned by algorithms.

== New data environment ==
More local information is being published as Open Data and more is available from commercial sources. The Acorn solution can be improved for only part of the country without losing information elsewhere. With a devolved government, most of Open Data is released, covering only England, only Scotland, only Wales, etc.
