= Message design logic =

Communication theory

Message design logic is a communication theory that makes the claim that individuals possess implicit theories of communication within themselves, called message design logics. Referred to as a “theory of theories,” Message Design Logic offers three different fundamental premises in reasoning about communication. As author Barbara O’Keefe describes, Message Design Logic is “the kind of communication-constituting belief system the message producer relies on in reasoning from the goals sought to the message design used.” These three premises — Expressive Logic, Conventional Logic, and Rhetorical Logic — are belief systems that communicators might utilize when designing messages. The message design logics, therefore, represent “internally consistent and developmentally ordered stages in the acquisition of working knowledge about the systematic properties of verbal messages.” As O’Keefe describes further, each premise is “associated with a constellation of related beliefs: a communication-constituting concept, a conception of the functional possibilities of communication, unit formation procedures, and principles of coherence.” The underlying idea behind O’Keefe's work is that “communication is not necessarily a uniform process.”

== Components ==
The three components of Message Design Logic are based on "individuals’ levels of cognitive complexity," and are expressed in messages that vary in organization, content, and effectiveness. Whether these components represent different levels of communication effectiveness is labeled as debatable by other communication scholars.

=== Expressive design logic ===
Seen as the simplest form of message production, the fundamental premise of Expressive Design Logic is that “Language is a medium for expressing thoughts and feelings.” This premise is the simplest of the three logics and explains that someone says what they feel. As long as this feeling is conveyed in the message, the message is deemed successful. O’Keefe gives two reasons why individuals who operate under this design logic are very literal when it comes to impression in message design and interpretation. “First, they fail to appreciate that in communication, the process of expression can be made to serve other goals, and second, they interpret messages as independent units rather than as threads in an interaction fabric.” Individuals that communicate expressively do not recognize the idea that messages might be designed to induce particular reactions by the receiver. They believe that messages are taken straightforwardly by a receiver who has thoughts, feelings, or reactions that are to be communicated back to the sender. Through this idea there are only two possible relationships that can be held between the speaker's intentions and messages; 1) To fully and honestly express the speaker's current mental state. 2) To convey a distorted version of the speaker's mental state though editing or lying. Due to the extreme straightforwardness of expressive messages they may contain multiple facets that can be viewed as negative when discussing communicative effectiveness, such as pointless content (excessive knowledge of what the speaker feels or wants), redundancies (due to a thought being recycled), noncontingent threats or insults (simple announcements of punishments), or inoffensive but inappropriate comments (complimentary personal remarks inappropriately delivered). Ultimately, individuals using Expressive Design Logic believe that the element that unites a speaker's messages is simply what is on the speaker's mind, whether they are items of information from one encounter or items from a complex chain of associations.

=== Conventional design logic ===
The fundamental premise of Conventional Design Logic is that “communication is a game played cooperatively, according to socially conventional rules and procedures.” As opposed to the expressive design logic, the communicator using conventional design logic distinguishes between thought and expression. In this design logic, language is viewed as means of expressing propositions that are “specified by the social effect one wants to achieve.” Those who practice conventional design logic consider various contexts as having fixed parameters and therefore design messages based upon what is most appropriate to the context. This message designing is done under the format of cooperation between the speaker and hearer. Using this logic is particularly valuable to achieve particular goals. Communication then is the means by which the goals are achieved. For example, someone constructing a conventional message would relate the message most to the context (the particular situation at hand) in order to achieve certain goals.

=== Rhetorical design logic ===
Seen as the most elaborate way of constructing messages, the fundamental premise of Rhetorical Design Logic is that “communication is the creation and negotiation of social selves and situations.” For communicators using this logic, messages are designed to portray what the speaker wants reality to reflect. Under this belief system, O’Keefe explains that “all meaning is treated as a matter of dramaturgical enactment and social negotiation.” As opposed to the conventional design logic, which says to design messages relevant to the given context, rhetorical design logic seeks to create the context using the designed messages. This creating of the context is accomplished using coordination and negotiation. For coordination, rhetorical design seeks to repeatedly solve coordination problems in order to create the social reality. For negotiation, communication operates under the presumption that it can “strategically exploit” meaning. Rhetorical message producers always “seek to achieve consensus and social legitimation for the reality they speak,” thus having the possibility of negotiation always available. Their messages are proactive rather than reactive, so they are designed towards effects rather than in response to the actions of others. Rhetorical messages also normally contain “elaborating and contextualizing clauses and phrases that provide explicit definitions of the context.” Lastly, O’Keefe summarizes the internal coherence of rhetorical designed messages as deriving from “the elements being related by intersubjectively available, goal-oriented schemes.”

== Verification and other uses ==
Many other scholars have verified and used O’Keefe's work for their own research. For example, Peterson and Albrecht uses Message Design Logic to posit the relationship between superiors’ and subordinates’ message design logic types. Likewise, another study done explored the relationships among individuals’ message design logics and their levels of social well-being. Dr. Gwen Hullman used Message Design Logic to help in the study of perceptions of communication competence. The conclusion of her research in relation to message design was that, “speakers of rhetorical regulative messages were perceived as more effective, more appropriate, and were rated as more competent.” These findings reflect the ideas O’Keefe stated in her original work in that rhetorical speakers can better align their goals with their partner's goals.

O’Keefe's Message Design Logic has also been used in a study done in 2005 by Carmen Cortes, Chad Larson, and Dale Hample. Their study was designed to see if the difference in interpersonal construct differentiation reflected the sophistication with which they designed their messages. In addition to Dr. Hullman's study, this article resulted as O’Keefe had predicted in her 1988 study, in which O’Keefe said that people who are more differentiated also tend to employ more sophisticated logics in a challenging situation. What Cortes, Larson, and Hample found is that “differentiation reflects the sophistication with which a person perceives others, and a Message Design Logic is a knowledge structure regarding communication.”

=== Criticism ===
While critics of this theory are hard to find, Joy Hart of Louisville University reviews and examines O’Keefe's work, including a full critique of assumptions she believes are being made. Hart claims that O’Keefe “assumes a developmental continuum for communication skill.” She examines the assumption that individuals may progress to the rhetorical message design logic, which is the highest level of development. She critiques this assumption as it is seen through cultural and intercultural differences. A specific assumption which Hart criticizes is the proposition that if a person is surrounded by a social environment or culture in which negotiation is possible, then that person will proceed more quickly to the rhetorical message design logic.
