= Jacqueline Beaujeu-Garnier =

French geographer

- Born: May 1, 1917
- Died: April 28, 1995 (aged 77)
- Occupation: Geographer

Jacqueline Beaujeu-Garnier (1 May 1917 – 28 April 1995) was a French geographer. She was president of the Société de Géographie from 1983 to 1995 and led the scientific publication L'Information géographique. With Philippe Pinchemel she founded the geographical periodical Hommes et Terres du Nord in 1963.

== Life ==
Beaujeu-Garnier began as an Assistant at the Sorbonne from 1942 to 1946. In 1947 she became the first woman in France to be awarded a doctorate in geography. She held professorships at the Faculties of Arts of Poitiers, Lille and from 1960 to 1986, she was a professor at the Sorbonne University.

== Publications ==
- Le Morvan et sa bordure : étude morphologique (thèse principale), 1947, publiée aux PUF en 1950.
- La Région du Brenner (thèse complémentaire), 1947
- L'Économie de l'Amérique latine, PUF, 1949. (nombreuses rééditions mises à jour)
- Trois milliards d'hommes : traité de démo-géographie, Hachette, 1965 (réédité en 1969).
- L'homme et la ville dans le monde actuel, Desclée de Brouwer, 1969.
- Europe et Amérique, Génin, 1969.
- Géographie de la population, 2 volumes, Génin, 1969–1973.
- Traité de géographie urbaine, with Georges Chabot, A. Colin, 1970.
- Les États-Unis : géographie humaine, Centre de documentation universitaire, 1970.
- La géographie : méthodes et perspectives, Masson et Cie, 1971.
- Paris et la région parisienne : atlas pour tous, with Jean Bastié, Berger-Levrault, 1972.
- (in English) France, Londres/New York, Longman, 1975.
- Atlas et géographie de Paris & la region d'Ile de France
