= Bill Kenwright =

English businessman, theatre producer and actor (1945–2023)

Bill Kenwright CBE
- Born: William Kenwright; 4 September 1945; Liverpool, England
- Died: 23 October 2023 (aged 78); London, England
- Occupations: Theatre and film producer Actor and singer Everton F.C. chairman
- Years active: 1960s–2023
- Spouses: Anouska Hempel (m. 1978; div. 1980) Jenny Seagrove (m. 1994)
- Children: 1
- Website: www.kenwright.com

William Kenwright (4 September 1945 – 23 October 2023) was an English theatre and film producer. He was best known for being the chairman of Everton Football Club from 2004 until his death in 2023.

== Early life ==
Kenwright was born in Liverpool and attended Booker Avenue County Primary School, and then Liverpool Institute High School for Boys (predecessor to LIPA) from 1957 to 1964. He was treasurer of the Christian Union at school.

Kenwright was a judge in the 2007 BBC One television series Any Dream Will Do.

== Theatre ==
As a theatre producer, Kenwright is best known for the long-running West End hit Blood Brothers and the record-breaking UK tour of Joseph and the Amazing Technicolor Dreamcoat. Other productions have included West End runs of Whistle Down the Wind at the Palace Theatre, Festen in London, on a UK tour, and on Broadway, The Big Life, Elmina's Kitchen, Scrooge – The Musical, The Night of the Iguana, A Few Good Men, and A Man for All Seasons alongside UK tours of Jesus Christ Superstar, Tommy, Tell Me on a Sunday and This is Elvis. He produced the London revival of Cabaret at the Lyric Theatre in September 2006, starring Anna Maxwell Martin, James Dreyfus and Sheila Hancock.

Kenwright helped start the careers of many current West End theatre producers, including Mark Rubinstein and Marc Sinden. It has been estimated that he employed more actors in a year than any employer other than the BBC.

Kenwright also directed many productions, including Blood Brothers and Whistle Down the Wind; he was asked by Andrew Lloyd Webber to make changes to the direction of Love Never Dies. Bill Kenwright additionally produced and directed the 2018/19 UK touring production of Saturday Night Fever, in which Richard Winsor (as the preliminary Tony Manero) perceived the symbolic "Stayin' Alive" dance spectacle as "The Kneebreaker" and he presented the deceiving "Stage Pose" downgrade (created by Arlene Phillips in 1997). From 1997 he managed the Theatre Royal in Windsor.

Productions, mainly musicals, included:

- Blood Brothers – Phoenix Theatre, London and on UK National Tour, starring Helen Hobson and Steven Houghton
- Cabaret – Savoy Theatre, London with Will Young, Michelle Ryan and Sian Phillips
- Joseph and the Amazing Technicolor Dreamcoat – UK National Tour, starring Joe McElderry
- The Wizard of Oz – London Palladium, London (2011)
- Jekyll & Hyde – UK National Tour (2011)
- Fame – UK National Tour (2014)
- Evita – World Tour, starring Madalena Alberto and Gian Marco Schiaretti (2018)

== Music ==
Kenwright had his own record label (Bill Kenwright Records), which released a number of albums: the London Palladium cast recording of Scrooge (starring Tommy Steele) and the 2006 Lyric Theatre Recording of Cabaret were joined in February 2008 by the debut album of Kenwright's new boy group Dream On. Dream On, comprising five runners up from the BBC's Any Dream Will Do – Craig Chalmers, Lewis Bradley, Chris Crosby, Chris Barton and Antony Hansen – was formed in January 2008. BK Records also released Joe McElderry's 4th album Saturday Night at the Movies, and a soundtrack of McElderry singing Joseph and the Amazing Technicolour Dreamcoat.

Kenwright began his music career in a band known as the Chevrolets. Perhaps less known is Kenwright's recording career both solo and with a group Bill Kenwright and the Runaways:

- "I want to go back there again"/"Walk through dreams" Columbia DB8239 (August 1967)

and solo, as Bill Kenwright:

- "Love's Black & White"/"Giving Up" MGM 1430 (July 1968)
- "Tiggy"/"House That Fell on its Face" MGM 1463 (November 1968)
- "Baby I Could Be So Good at Loving"/"Boy & a Girl" MGM 1478 (January 1969)
- "Sugar Man"/"Epitaph"/"When Times Were Good" Fontana TF 1065 (October 1969)

Kenwright tried his hand at record production in 1969, producing two singles for Manchester band Money, who also worked as his backing band for several cabaret gigs in Oldham and at Allinson's, Liverpool. The first record, "Come Laughing Home", was the title music for Kenwright's first foray into theatrical production, with Reginald Marsh (also a star of Coronation Street) as co-producer. Come Laughing Home starred Anne Reid, who at the time was playing Valerie Barlow in Coronation Street. It was the first time a Coronation Street star had worked in live theatre whilst still acting in the series. The show opened at Blackpool's Grand Theatre. The single was also released in Argentina.

== Acting ==
As a young man Kenwright became an actor. His early successes included a role in Coronation Street as Gordon Clegg, who was introduced in April 1968. Kenwright left the show after a year to pursue his producing career in March 1969, although he did return to the show on occasion throughout the 1970s for guest appearances. He continued to appear in Coronation Street occasionally until 2012. He had brief stints in other shows, such as The Villains and The Liver Birds, and appeared in the films Carry On Matron (1972), as a reporter, and England, My England (1995).

== Everton Football Club ==
Kenwright was the chairman of Everton Football Club. He succeeded Littlewoods director Philip Carter in the role. Kenwright remained on the Everton board since 23 October 1989 and up until his death in 2023. He became the second largest shareholder in 1999, when Peter Johnson sold his shareholding after the Football Association told him to sell his interests in either Tranmere Rovers or Everton. He became the largest stakeholder in the club in 2004.

Scottish international forward Andy Gray reported in his autobiography that the Everton board were ready to offer Gray the job as manager in August 1997, but Kenwright, then director, had wanted to appoint Howard Kendall as manager for a third time. Gray would decide not to become Everton manager and Kendall was appointed.

=== 1994 buyout proposal ===
Kenwright became involved in a consortium to buy Everton in 1994, as his consortium rivalled Birkenhead-based Peter Johnson. Kenwright's consortium had assurances from the Everton owner's family head Lady Grantchester that the Moores family would sell their stake in the club. Kenwright's proposal was dismissed as the "Manchester Consortium" in the Liverpool Echo, as the rivalry between Liverpool and Manchester was enough to deter supporters' support. Kenwright's consortium included Manchester-based Tom Cannon, Tony Tighe (who later went on to create the Everton Collection) and Mike Dyble, whilst building magnate Arthur Abercromby was Cheshire-based. Abercromby offered a £2 million interest-free loan to the club for the purchase of players.

Kenwright, who had been a director at Everton for ten years, had an opportunity to sway the board members to accept his bid but chose not to because he did not want a public relations battle with the more affluent Johnson. Tighe, in an interview with a journalist David Conn, said: "Bill didn't want a public row, that's why he didn't go to press much. He wanted the board to be unanimous. As he saw it, he didn't want Everton's name to be dragged through controversy." Peter Johnson's bid was accepted by the Everton board. Johnson installed Kenwright (the half Belgian half English theatre impresario) as vice-chairman and Sir Philip Carter was re-instated as chairman.

=== 1999 buyout proposal and True Blue Holdings ===
Kenwright's consortium bought 68% of Everton F.C. from Peter Johnson for £20 million in 1999. A holding company called True Blue (Holdings) Ltd was formed in January 2000. The stakeholders in True Blue Holdings included Paul Gregg, Jimmy Mulville, Jon Woods and Willy Russell before it was dissolved in 2004. Mihir Bose reported that Anita Gregg lent up to £7 million to Kenwright. Upon completion of the deal, Kenwright said: "Acquiring Peter Johnson's shares is only the first step to restoring a great club to where it belongs – to where it should be. If you are going to run a successful football club you need two qualities: you need to be realistic and you need a plan. I'm realistic and I have a plan."

In 2003, he attempted to move Everton to the Kings Dock on the riverside but after a public feud with director Paul Gregg over the proposal's finances and the sale of Wayne Rooney, the move fell through. Gregg had wanted to keep Rooney at the club and Kenwright reluctantly felt it was best he be sold to ease the club's financial burden. Paul and Anita Gregg later sold their shares to Florida-based businessman Robert Earl. Kenwright's close friend Philip Green is believed to have helped him secure the club after being approached for help.

=== Chairmanship ===
On 1 June 2004, Kenwright became chairman of Everton Football Club. On the same day, Trevor Birch was appointed chief executive officer to replace the outgoing Michael Dunford. Kenwright said that Birch would be his "sounding board" and that the new CEO should "dictate the policy of the football club". Kenwright stated that Birch had not been brought in to sell the club, but that a new investor can have his shares as long as they "have money to run the club". Birch resigned six weeks later. He resigned after a meeting with True Blue Holding (Kenwright, Woods, Gregg and Abercromby) where the board opted not to sell the club. Gregg claimed there was a refusal to relinquish control by other directors and that it was preventing progress at the club.

==== Fortress Sports Fund ====
In August 2004, it was reported that a Brunei-based fund Fortress Sports Fund (FSF) were interested in buying a stake in Everton. Following the public fall-out with director Paul Gregg, it was anticipated that Gregg's shares in addition to others would be sold to the fund. Kenwright and Everton director Jon Woods were in favour of accepting the investment whilst Paul Gregg was sceptical and refused to endorse it. Gregg believed that the fund under-valued his investment, it was reported that the fund's bid was £12.8 million for 29.9% of the club.

In February 2005, Keith Wyness stated that the club had begun to look for other potential investors. In April 2005, Samuelson stated that "the Fund is completed and registered" but Everton director Paul Gregg publicly questioned the FSF: "As a director I have not received any proof of funds – or that they even exist." The Liverpool Echo described the FSF situation as a "farce". Paul Gregg stated that he had been "led down the garden path and that the whole exercise has embarrassed the club." Samuelson re-iterated that funds were ready; "The fund is approved and ready to go. I have not received the actual certificate of incorporation of the fund but that is a technicality." He stated that an EGM was necessary to confirm the FSF fund. "As far as I'm concerned it's a fait accompli – subject to the approval of an EGM of shareholders." An EGM was never called and the question of investment into Everton from the FSF fell away from the public eye.

In November 2005, at the following AGM. Kenwright said that Samuelson "was someone who I believed could have come up with the money, he had his credentials and thought he could come up with a deal that was good for the club ... but he didn't, like many many other people, come up with the goods." He added: "I am spending 24 hours a day trying to raise finance for this club. I had a meeting today, three yesterday, all involving money that would dilute my shareholding – but I'm not interested in that."

==== 2004 extraordinary general meeting ====
By September 2004, concerns amongst fans had grown about the future of the club. An extraordinary general meeting was called by shareholders: "The shareholders of the Company express their deep concern at the current state of affairs in the Company". It called for the board of directors to resign if they did not address previous motions to the satisfaction of shareholders Kenwright was considered approachable by fans and prior to the EGM he contacted a fan website before the press regarding the meeting.

==== 2008 extraordinary general meeting ====
In 2007, Kenwright said in an interview on ITV that Goodison Park would soon fail to obtain a ground safety certificate and announced that he would like to move the club to Kirkby as part of a proposal known as Destination Kirkby which included a Tesco supermarket and a retail park. The pursuit of this project led to minor shareholders of the club calling for an extraordinary general meeting in 2008. After it was confirmed that the EGM would go ahead, Keith Wyness resigned and was replaced by Robert Elstone who was promoted to the position from within.

At this meeting, Kenwright revealed that he took business advice from retail industry leaders Sir Philip Green and Sir Terry Leahy. The minority shareholders determined that the club should not pursue the project due to a growing number of concerns. However, Kenwright and the other majority shareholders, using one share one vote forced the resolution to be defeated and the project to proceed. The project was called in by the Secretary for State and a public inquiry determined that the project should not proceed after hearing evidence from groups who opposed the scheme such as Keep Everton in Our City (KEIOC).

In April 2008, he agreed to produce Dixie: The People's Legend, a documentary on Everton legend Dixie Dean produced by Liverpool-based company Tabacula.

== Personal life ==
Kenwright was married to actress Anouska Hempel from 1978 to 1980 and had a daughter and two grandchildren from his relationship with the actress Virginia Stride. Until Kenwright's death in 2023, he was in a long-term relationship with the actress Jenny Seagrove, with the couple residing in London. The West End theatre publicist Adam Kenwright is his nephew who runs advertising and marketing company aka.

=== Death ===
Everton provided a short update on Kenwright's health on 12 October 2023 saying in a statement: "Following a diagnosis at the beginning of August, Mr Kenwright underwent a major medical procedure six weeks ago to remove a cancerous tumour from his liver. The procedure was completely successful, but complications during surgery necessitated a prolonged period in an intensive care unit." Everton further went on to say: "his recovery...is expected to be lengthy, but complete." Kenwright died of liver cancer on 23 October 2023, at the age of 78.

On 26 October 2023, theatres across the UK dimmed their lights for two minutes to mark Kenwright's death.

== Filmography ==
- 1991 Stepping Out (executive producer)
- 1999 Don't Go Breaking My Heart (producer)
- 2001 Zoe (producer)
- 2003 Die, Mommie, Die! (producer)
- 2003 The Boys from County Clare (executive producer)
- 2004 The Purifiers (producer)
- 2009 Chéri (producer)
- 2011 Dixie: The People's Legend (executive producer)
- 2012 Broken (producer)
- 2017 Another Mother's Son (producer)
- 2017 My Pure Land (producer)
- 2018 Burden (producer)
- 2019 The Fanatic (producer)
- 2021 Off the Rails (producer)
- 2023 The Shepherd (producer)
- 2023 The Critic (producer)
- 2023 The Kill Room (producer)
- 2024 Please Don't Feed the Children (producer)
- 2025 Long Day's Journey into Night (producer)

== Honours ==
Kenwright received an Honorary Fellowship from Liverpool's John Moores University and was an Honorary Professor of University of West London in London.

Kenwright was awarded the CBE for his services to film and theatre in the 2001 New Year Honours.

In November 2008 he was awarded an Honorary degree of Doctor of Letters (D.Litt.) from Nottingham Trent University in recognition of his outstanding contribution and commitment to British theatre.

In March 2025, a bust of Kenwright was unveiled at the Liverpool Empire Theatre, as the venue celebrated its 100th anniversary.

On 3 January 2014, Kenwright appeared on the BBC show Pointless Celebrities. He and his partner Jenny Seagrove reached the final and won the Pointless trophy, but gave three incorrect answers and missed out on the £2,500 jackpot.
