= Dave Lewis (businessman) =

British businessman (born 1965)

Sir Dave Lewis
- Born: March 1965 (age 61); Yorkshire, England
- Education: Trent Polytechnic
- Occupation: Businessman
- Years active: 1987–present
- Title: CEO, Diageo
- Term: 2026–present
- Predecessor: Debra Crew
- Board member of: PepsiCo
- Spouse(s): first wife Helena Wayth
- Children: 2

Sir David John Lewis (born 1965) is a British business executive. He is the chief executive of Diageo, effective from January 2026. He was previously the chief executive of Tesco from 2014 to 2020 and Chair of Haleon from 2022 to 2025. Prior to joining Tesco, he was president of global personal care at Unilever. He is a trustee of The Royal Foundation and chair of the World Wide Fund UK.

== Early life and education ==
Lewis was born in March 1965, in Yorkshire. He attended Hills Road Sixth Form College in Cambridge from 1979 to 1981.

After Thorne Grammar School, Lewis attended Trent Polytechnic, now Nottingham Trent University, graduating with a BA in Business Studies in 1987.

In 2002, he completed a six-week Advanced Management Programme at Harvard Business School. In 2012, Nottingham Trent University awarded Lewis an honorary doctorate.

== Career ==
Lewis worked at Unilever for over 27 years in various posts. In August 2014, he left the company to become CEO of the British multinational retailer Tesco. Lewis left Tesco in September 2020. In September 2021, Lewis joined energy startup Xlinks as executive chair.

=== Unilever ===
In 1987, after graduating from Nottingham Trent University, Lewis obtained a post as graduate trainee at the Anglo-Dutch multinational Unilever, in the UK. He worked at Unilever for 27 years from 1987 until September 2014. Between 1990 and 1992, he worked at National Accounts for the company.

One of the biggest successes of his career at Unilever was in 1992 when he launched Dove, a personal care brand, in the UK. The launch of Dove in the UK was seen as a success considering the fact that Dove is now one of Unilever's largest brands contributing $5.885 billion to the company for the year 2014. A year later, in 1993, he became company operations manager for Lever Brothers Ltd, a subsidiary of Unilever in the UK.

During his time at Unilever, Lewis worked in various positions across the company around the world. In 1996, after 12 years at the company, Lewis moved to South America to become Marketing Director of River Plate which involved Argentina, Paraguay and Uruguay. Three years later, in 1999, he moved to Indonesia where he worked as Managing Director of Unilever for the personal care business of the country. According to Unilever, Lewis managed an average annual growth rate of 30% for the business of personal care of Indonesia. He served at this post until September 2001.

In 2002, he attended Harvard Business School, where he completed the Advanced Management Programme before becoming Senior Vice President for Home and Personal Care of Central and Eastern Europe in 2002. He served at this post for three years. In 2005, he returned to the UK and worked as Managing Director of the UK's home and personal care business.

In 2004, Lewis and his team came up with an unconventional approach called the "Real Beauty" campaign as a marketing strategy for Unilever's Dove brand. This involved using everyday women rather than models in the brand's advertisements. The campaign received a positive response.

In 2007, he was appointed chairman of Unilever for UK and Ireland.

In 2010, Lewis became president for the Americas. In 2011, he became President of Personal Care of the company. He occupied this post until October 2014, when he became CEO of Tesco.

When working at Unilever, he was nicknamed "Drastic Dave" which was a reflection of his management actions which included reducing the number of products produced by the company from 1600 to 400 and for cutting jobs which led to a decrease of 40% in company expenditure for the year 2007. Before the announcement in July 2014 that he would be leaving the company, he was a candidate to become Paul Polman's successor as CEO of Unilever.

=== Tesco ===
In July 2014, it was announced that Lewis was leaving Unilever to become CEO of Tesco. This was the result of Tesco's previous CEO, Philip Clarke, stepping down from his post which he obtained in 2011. Lewis was scheduled to start work as CEO of Tesco on 1 October 2014, but he began work a month earlier than planned, on 1 September 2014.

Lewis became CEO after the debacle when it was revealed to the public that Tesco overestimated their profits by £250 million for the year 2014. Tesco had chosen Lewis to replace Clarke due to the many years of experience Lewis has gained throughout his career at Unilever working at various posts for both the national (UK) market as well as the international market. Lewis also has experience working with Tesco directly, being one of Tesco's largest suppliers of brands including Dove, Vaseline and Lynx.

Lewis began working at Tesco in September 2014 with a basic annual salary of £1.25 million.

His total annual pay for financial year 2017, as reported in May 2018, was £4.9 million.

In October 2019, Tesco announced that Lewis will step down as CEO in 2020, and would be succeeded by Ken Murphy. Lewis told the board he wanted to leave in 2018 and John Allan, the chairman, said internal candidates were considered but no one was experienced enough. He left the company on 30 September 2020.

Lewis was knighted in the 2021 New Year Honours for services to the food industry and business.

=== Xlinks ===
Lewis joined Xlinks, a start-up energy company in September 2021, as executive chair. Xlinks has ambitious plans for its Morocco – UK Power Project, which aims to install massive solar and wind energy farms in the sunny and windy Morocco desert, along with batteries for energy storage, and build massive high-voltage direct-current (HVDC) undersea cables to deliver the power to the UK. Given the project's major HVDC cable requirements, the project also plans to build cable factories in the UK.

=== Board positions ===
In February 2021, Lewis was appointed as a director of A Bird's Eye View, a business consultancy founded by his wife, Helena Wayth.

In October 2021, Lewis was appointed as the UK Government's new supply chain advisor and co-chair of the Supply Chain Advisory Group.

In November 2021, he joined PepsiCo's Board of Directors.

In December 2021, he was announced as the chairman of GlaxoSmithKline's consumer healthcare business, effective from January 2022. The consumer healthcare business was subsequently spun off as Haleon in July 2022, with Lewis continuing as Chair.

=== Diageo ===
On 10 November 2025, the Board of Directors of Diageo announced that Lewis had been appointed as Chief Executive Officer and Executive Director, effective from 1 January 2026. The appointment followed a rigorous global search process led by Diageo's Chairman, John Manzoni, after the departure of previous CEO Debra Crew in July 2025.

Lewis was selected for his extensive experience leading global consumer businesses and his track record in building world-class brands. Commenting on his appointment, Lewis stated: "Diageo is a world leading business with a portfolio of very strong brands, and I am delighted to be joining the team. The market faces some headwinds but there are also significant opportunities."

As CEO, Lewis receives an annual salary of £1.5 million, a pension contribution of 14% of base salary, and is eligible for the company's annual incentive plan and long-term incentive plan. Lewis stepped down as Chair of Haleon on 31 December 2025 to take up the Diageo role.

== Personal life ==
Lewis is divorced from his first wife, with whom he has two daughters. He is now married to Helena Wayth. They live in Richmond, London.

In interviews he has stated that he likes to stay physically active and particularly enjoys running. He believes and has stated that: "Improving the health and vitality of our people is an essential requirement". In 2008, he participated in the London Marathon sponsored by Flora, one of Unilever's brands.

His other hobbies include photography, cooking, and playing golf and racket sports. In an interview for the London Evening Standard he revealed that being surrounded by the river and the park in Richmond, where he currently lives, encourages him to stay physically active.

== Criticism ==
Lewis has been heavily criticised for not responding to calls to improve Tesco's broiler chicken welfare in line with that of KFC, Waitrose, M&S and Unilever, despite a lengthy campaign by pressure group Open Cages. The Times released an article in August 2019 featuring a video exposé of birds displaying "serious mobility problems" inside of an intensive Tesco supplier farm, however Lewis has not commented on the matter.

In May 2019, an undercover investigation of a Thailand Tesco egg supplier, released by the Daily Mirror, found Tesco was serving Thai customers eggs from battery cage farms. In August 2019, an investigation of the company producing Tesco's own-brand eggs in Malaysia, broken by the New Straits Times, documented similar conditions. In response to the investigation, Tesco committed to ending the sale of caged eggs in Thailand and Malaysia.

Business positions
Preceded by Philip Clarke	CEO of Tesco; 2014–2020	Succeeded by Ken Murphy
Preceded by Debra Crew	CEO of Diageo; 2026–present	Succeeded by Incumbent
