= Sir Terry =

Sir Terry may refer to:

- Terry Farrell (architect) (born 1938), British architect and urban designer
- Terry Farrell (cricketer) (born 1939), English cricketer
- Terry Frost (1915–2003), English artist
- Terry Leahy (born 1956), former CEO of British supermarket chain Tesco
- Terry Matthews (born 1943), Welsh-born Canadian entrepreneur
- Terry Pratchett (1948–2015), English novelist
- Terry Wogan (1938–2016), Irish broadcaster who received an honorary Knighthood in the 2005 Queen's Birthday Honours List
