= The Kirkby Project =

Proposed football stadium in Kirkby, England

Coordinates: 53.479261°N 2.889748°W

Everton Kirkby Project
- Interactive map of Everton Kirkby Project
- Location: Kirkby, Merseyside
- Owner: Everton F.C.
- Operator: Knowsley Council
- Capacity: 50,401
- Surface: Grass

Construction
- Cost: £78,000,000 construction cost, part of a £240 million development
- Architects: Barr Construction (Stadium Build & Design); KSS (Interior Suites)

The Kirkby Project was a proposed new football stadium in Kirkby for Everton. The stadium, if built, would have replaced Goodison Park as Everton's home ground. The plan originated in 2006, was the subject of a Public Inquiry in December 2008, but was eventually rejected by central government in November 2009. The stadium had a planned all-seated capacity of 50,401 with a provision to be expanded to 60,000.

== Tesco and Knowsley partnership ==
The stadium was to have been be part of a retail park complex which has been planned by Tesco and Knowsley Council. The stadium would have cost Everton Football Club £78 million to build, and supermarket giants Tesco's involvement would have provided £52 million of 'value'. The overall stadium value was reported as a minimum of £130 million up to £150 million. It was not revealed how Tesco's involvement would have benefited Everton F.C. because of "confidentiality issues" and no details on costing was given at the Public Inquiry which was called to see whether the project could go ahead.

Tesco purchased the existing town centre stores from Development Securities for £65 million following DevSec's decision to withdraw their planning application for the site. Tesco also purchased an adjoining piece of land south of Cherryfield Drive for £12 million from Knowsley Council. Tesco intend to reroute the River Alt, relocate the wildlife living there and remove the woodland from the site to make it viable for the stadium.

The £52 million cross-subsidy was sarcastically described as a "miracle of modern economics" by Liverpool City Council's barrister Stephen Sauvain. He told planning inspector Wendy Burden: "Tesco's expert doesn’t think the money is coming from Tesco and Ms Ramsey doesn’t think it's coming from Knowsley, so it's a miracle of modern economics, because nobody is prepared to tell you what the situation really is."

Everton director Robert Earl had previously described Tesco's contribution as "manna from heaven" and a "non-reimbursable cheque" in the Liverpool Echo.

Other stadiums which have been built with retail enablers include Parc y Scarlets (Llanelli), McDiarmid Park (Perth), St Mirren Park (Paisley), Stadium MK (Milton Keynes), Liberty Stadium (Swansea), Ricoh Arena (Coventry) and Halliwell Jones Stadium (Warrington).

== Early move plans ==
In December 2004, Everton again began looking at the possibility of leaving Goodison Park for a new stadium. In 2006, two possibilities of a location for the ground being in Liverpool and another possible location in Kirkby (in the neighbouring borough of Knowsley) were put forward. Everton said at their AGM they have signed an exclusive deal to look at the Kirkby proposal but will not move out of the city without the fans backing. On 7 February 2007 Everton submitted their initial proposals to Knowsley Council, with a preferred location being next to Knowsley Community College, off Cherryfield Drive in Kirkby.

The Kirkby option included a stadium designed loosely on that of FC Köln's stadium in Germany selected for the World Cup in 2006. It was part of a development known as 'Destination Kirkby' which was backed by Terry Leahy the CEO of the supermarket chain Tesco and would include a Tesco supermarket, a hotel and a retail park with car parking.

=== Kirkby Golf Course and King's Dock ===
In 1996, Everton F.C. under Peter Johnson released plans to relocate Everton to a new stadium on the site of Kirkby Golf Course.

A fan-funded organisation was set up by supporters called 'Goodison For Everton' who later commissioned the architects behind Twickenham's redevelopment for a feasibility report which supports the view that Goodison Park can be redeveloped. In 2000, Everton released plans for a proposed new 50,000-seat stadium that would form part of the King's Dock development in Liverpool on the Mersey waterfront.

A ballot of supporters at this time found that, of those questioned, 85% would prefer to leave Goodison Park for a new stadium. As part of the proposal, Everton would be granted "preferred bidder" status and would contribute £30m towards the project. However, the club failed to raise the money necessary and were forced to pull out of the project in 2003.

There were rumours that Everton's preference for a new stadium site was Stanley Park, before planning approval was granted to Liverpool F.C.

=== Ground-share ===
In 2005, with the announcement that Liverpool were planning a new stadium to replace Anfield, Everton met with the then Sports Minister Richard Caborn, the city council and representatives of Liverpool to discuss the possibility of a ground-share. This proposal was however not greeted with significant enthusiasm by either club, and so Liverpool have continued the project alone.

The ground share idea was reintroduced in 2008 when Liverpool City Council leader Warren Bradley told the local press that he had been working on it behind the scenes. Former CEOs at both clubs (Liverpool's Rick Parry and Everton's Keith Wyness) dismissed the idea as a non-starter.

However, following the rejection of the club's plans by the government and the financial problems at both Everton and Liverpool, the idea of a groundshare has been raised again.

== Proposed plans ==
On 20 July 2007 the proposed stadium plans were produced for the Kirkby option. However prior to this Everton conducted a ballot to decide if it was the best option would be held with eligible voters being current season ticket holders, individuals who have had a season ticket in the last three years, adult Evertonia members and shareholders. Complimentary season ticket holders were not eligible to vote.

On Goodison Park's 115th anniversary, 24 August 2007 the result was announced.

As a result, Everton will continue to negotiate plans with Tesco and Knowsley Borough Council. An application was submitted to Knowsley Council by the club and Tesco on 2 January 2008.

On 9 June 2008, Knowsley Council approved of the plans with 20 councillors voting in favour and 1 against. Keith Wyness, the club's CEO said:

"The next big step comes in the form of trying to ensure the project is not 'called-in' for inquiry form the government."

On 6 August 2008, the project was called in by the Government. In a statement by the club, Everton were said to be "disappointed by the decision.".

=== Stand capacities ===
These are approximate for Planning Statement purposes and include general spectators, hospitality, directors, disabled, press and media but exclude players.

	Lower Tier	Upper Tier	Tier Total
North Stand	5,684	5,378	11,062
West Stand	6,725	7,232	13,957
East Stand	7,030	7,300	14,330
South Stand^{(includes away section)}	5,674	5,378	11,052
Total	25,113	25,288	50,401

== Objections ==
=== Location and transportation ===
The site for the proposed stadium was 4 miles from Goodison Park in the suburb of Kirkby, population 42,000.

The Kirkby Project (Merseyside)

Concerns were raised by those who oppose the development that public transport for spectators may be limited as the site's location is 8 miles from Liverpool city centre.

The stadium was praised as being the "best served transportation wise of any stadium in the north west if not the UK" by Keith Wyness. Steer Davies Gleave, the company responsible for the transport arrangements at major stadiums in the country (notably Wembley Stadium and Emirates Stadium), later suggested the phrasing by Wyness used was inaccurate and "comprehensive" would be a more fitting description.

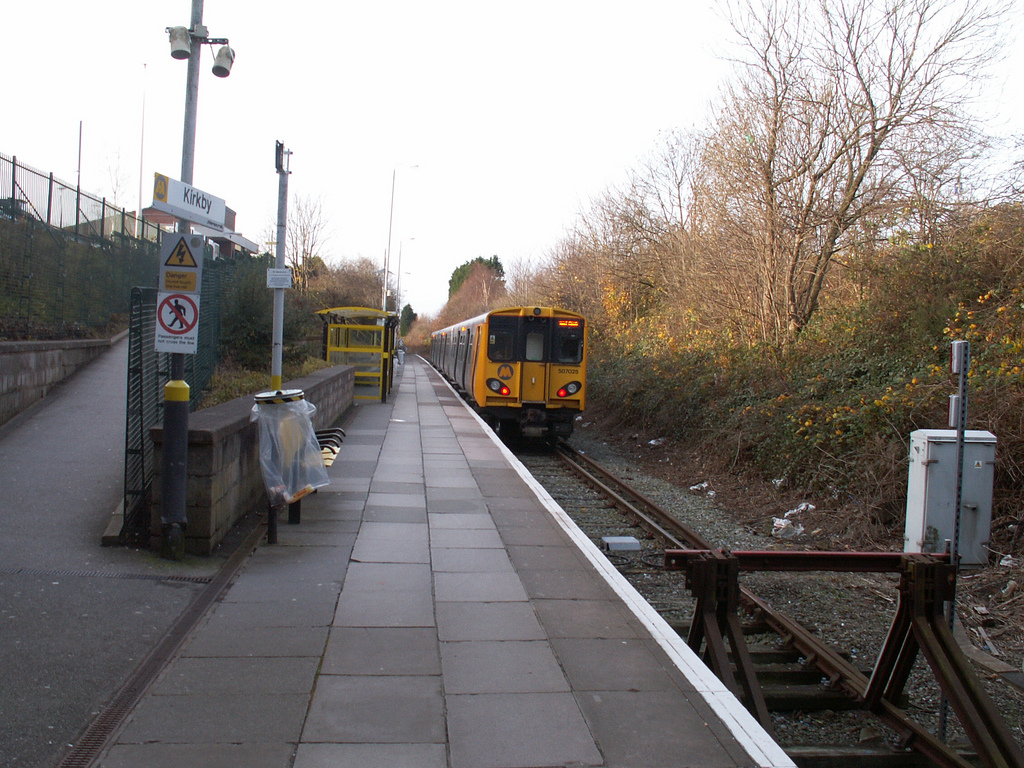
Kirkby railway station is nearest to the stadium

The proposed site was located adjacent to the M57 and A580 East Lancashire Road with the M58 close by. These major roads link to the main north west motorways of the M6 and the M62. However, there were concerns amongst some fans, Merseytravel, and Network Rail that the existing bus network and local railway station will not be able to cope with the demand for a 50,401-capacity stadium.

=== Keep Everton In Our City Campaign ===
At an open meeting for Evertonians on 10 March 2007, a movement named Keep Everton In Our City (KEIOC) was inaugurated, with the stated aim of preventing Everton Football Club moving to a site that they did not feel was adequate for a Premier league football club for varying reasons.

Liverpool Council Leader, Liberal Democrat Warren Bradley, was in attendance and stated that the City Council have a strong desire to keep Everton Football Club within the city. He and Joe Anderson, leader of the opposition Labour group, later accused the previous council of 'shame' in not doing enough to keep Everton within the city boundaries.

Former Everton players have backed the KEIOC movement including ex-Everton fans favourite Duncan Ferguson and Tony Kay.Former (and current) Everton manager David Moyes was photographed with fan campaign group Keep Everton in Our City during a pre-season tour in the United States. A club official said '"He was not aware of the wording on the banner when the photograph was taken.'". David Moyes has never commented.

Keep Everton In Our City went on to voice their concerns over the stadium proposal at the Public Inquiry.

=== Naming rights ===
The club's press officer Ian Ross said that the club could obtain up to £6million per annum for the naming rights for the new stadium.

He said: "We are currently in the throes of finding the best naming rights deal. That has involved meeting some of the biggest companies in the world."

"We could be looking at deals which generate maybe £5m or £6m a year. As Keith Wyness has hinted already, the whole thing could be self-financing."

Earlier Robert Elstone, the club's then deputy Chief Executive Officer had said the figure would be closer to £4.5million per annum.

Elstone also said: 'We are known as the people's club and so we are trying to live up to that. We're looking for a brand that fits with the consumers, who are typically 18-35-year-old males.' Elstone said the club is looking to secure a 15-year deal and that the brand could be the same company that sponsors the club's shirt as is the case with Bolton and Reebok, and Arsenal and Emirates.

The club appointed Anschutz Entertainment Group (AEG) to find a company willing to purchase the stadium naming rights. Two Liverpool based companies Ampersand Communications and Mocha were commissioned to create a DVD and interactive pop-up book. Everton gave 500 DVDs and DVD players to prospective partners.

Robert Elstone revealed he had been in talks with a Japanese company.

=== CABE ===
In March 2008, a government body, the Commission for Architecture and the Built Environment issued a report that stated:

"This scheme does not meet the criteria in terms of design quality set out in PPS1 and we do not think that it should receive planning permission.".

It was also described as "at best, a lost opportunity".

=== Local authorities ===
A number of local authorities objected to the scheme, including Liverpool City Council, Sefton Council, West Lancashire Council and St Helens Council as they felt that the accompanying retail park would have a detrimental effect to towns in their area. The Liverpool City Council leader Warren Bradley referred to the Everton's proposed stadium in Kirkby as "a cow shed in a small town". The objections led to more controversy as Knowsley councillor Eddie Connor publicly stated that Liverpool political party leaders Warren Bradley and Joe Anderson should not have been able to address their planning committee's due to their footballing allegiances to Everton.

Joe Anderson reacted angrily to the suggestion that he was putting football before his civic duty, and responded "Let me be clear to both EFC and Knowsley Council, you will not silence me on speaking out and representing what I believe to be in the best interests of the people of Liverpool, that is what I am elected to do."

The Duke of Westminster's company Grosvenor Group and developers St. Modwen Properties lodged an objection. Grosvenor argued that the development may have an adverse effect on Liverpool city centre (but not their own Liverpool One project) and St. Modwen stated that nearby Skelmersdale would suffer if the development went ahead.

=== State Aid accusations ===
Liverpool City Council representatives Cushman and Wakefield suggested that Everton are attempting to receive state aid as they will not fund their share of the stadium from retail enabling as Everton originally stated.

"In reality, if there be any cross subsidy of the Everton Football Club Stadium, it is not being generated by the retail proposal but in fact by public sector subsidy through reduced land receipt from the proposed disposal."

They suggested that it would be funded from land value increases as a result of planning permission being given for a retail park being given on what is currently public land:

"Given that Everton Football Club is a private company and not a community facility owned by the community, it seems to me that what really lies beneath this proposal is arguably nothing other than State aid to Everton Football Club."

=== Rebranding of Kirkby ===
Knowsley Council announced that they are looking to brand itself as the 'home' of Everton F.C., to help boost the national profile of Knowsley.

7.12 If Kirkby and Knowsley became the home and 'partner' of Everton F.C., the borough would be in line to receive a significant amount of publicity on an international stage. The exact details of the new Premier League TV deal are still to be finalised and there will need to be discussions between the Council and Everton over the branding and media links between the two parties. Issues are likely to include how Knowsley brands itself as "The Home of Everton F.C."'

The council currently does this on the M57 motorway with hoardings advertising the borough as home of QVC. They also intend to move Everton's charity 'Everton in the community' and BBL Basketball Team Everton Tigers to Knowsley.

Further community benefits from the redevelopment include the new civic facilities, including a library and gallery, and the provision of community services by Everton in the Community from a new local base.

== Proposed alternatives ==
=== Scotland Road ===
Former Everton Chief Executive, Keith Wyness met with Liverpool City Council to discuss an alternative site within the city in the Everton district adjacent to Scotland Road on land known as the 'loop' next to the Wallasey Tunnel. However he dismissed it as he did not believe it would have the potential for a 75,000 capacity stadium. Sir Anwar Pervez and his company Bestway devised an alternative stadium scheme with Liverpool City Council. It would have seen Everton move to just outside Liverpool city centre. Bestway property director Malcolm Carter said: "We have recently been presented with an opportunity which, for the city, would combine the massive desirability of allowing Everton FC to remain within the city of Liverpool and come home to Everton, while acting as a catalyst for the regeneration of the wider area. This would involve developing a new stadium and associated commercial enterprises both within our existing location and on neighbouring sites. Bestway already has a design team in place and are in discussion with a stadium contractor about working up proposals which, from an initial assessment, are very feasible. We know that a football stadium will fit into our site and could work in this location. It would be the blue heart of the city."

Everton fans voted to move to Kirkby in a ballot and Scotland Road site plans were put on hiatus.

=== Rejection by the Government ===
On 25 November 2009, Everton's plans to build a new stadium in Kirkby were rejected by the government. The club started exploring other options as well as working to fix the problems found in the Kirkby proposal. A shared stadium with rival Liverpool was also an option.

At the Liverpool City Council Regeneration and Transport Select Committee meeting on 10 February 2011, a proposal was made to open the eastern section of the Liverpool Outer Loop line from Hunts Cross to Walton, using "Liverpool Football Club and Everton Football Club as priorities, as economic enablers of the project". This proposal, if proceeded with, would place both football clubs on a rapid-transit Merseyrail line circling the city giving high-throughput, fast transport access. It would have entailed Liverpool F.C. abandoning its then-planned relocation from Anfield to the nearby Stanley Park Stadium.
