= Philip Clarke (businessman) =

British businessman (born 1960)

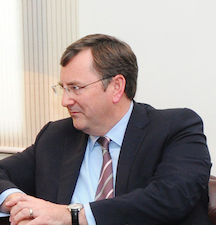
- Born: Philip Andrew Clarke; 8 March 1960 (age 66); Liverpool, UK
- Education: University of Liverpool
- Occupation: Businessman
- Years active: 1981–present
- Term: 2011–2014
- Predecessor: Sir Terry Leahy
- Successor: Dave Lewis
- Spouse: Linda Clarke
- Children: 2

Philip Andrew Clarke (born 8 March 1960) is a British businessman. He served as the chief executive officer of Tesco plc until 1 September 2014.

== Biography ==
=== Early life ===
He was born in Liverpool, where his father was a Tesco store manager on the Wirral for many years, and gave Clarke his first job as a schoolboy in 1974.

He was educated at the Liverpool Blue Coat School and went on to graduate with an economics degree from the University of Liverpool.

=== Career ===
Having initially stacked shelves at his local Tesco, he returned after graduating to join the Tesco Management Training Programme in 1981. Appointed to the Board of Directors in 1998, he then went on to replace Sir Terry Leahy in 2011. He sits on the board of directors of the Consumer Goods Forum.

In July 2014, Philip announced that he was leaving Tesco's board, effective 1 October 2014, which was brought forward to 1 September 2014.

Clarke was due to have a party celebrating 40 years at Tesco but this was cancelled the day before suggesting that the departure came sooner than expected. His leaving came after a disastrous 3 years overseeing the company's first profit warning in 20 years, and an accounting scandal in 2014.

== Personal life ==
He lives in Hertfordshire with his wife, Linda, and has two children.

Business positions
Preceded by Sir Terry Leahy	CEO of Tesco; 2011–2014	Succeeded by Dave Lewis
