= Ken Murphy (businessman) =

Irish businessman (born 1966/67)

- Born: 1966 or 1967 (age 58–59); Cork, Ireland
- Education: University College Cork
- Occupation: Business executive
- Title: CEO, Tesco
- Term: October 2020–
- Predecessor: Dave Lewis
- Children: 3

Ken Murphy (born 1966/1967) is an Irish business executive. He has been the chief executive (CEO) of Tesco since October 2020.

== Early life ==
Murphy was born in Cork, Ireland. He was educated there at Christian Brothers College, and earned a bachelor's degree from University College Cork in 1988, before attending the six-week Advanced Management Programme at Harvard Business School. He qualified as an accountant and worked at Coopers & Lybrand after graduating.

== Career ==
Murphy started his career at Procter & Gamble. When he was 22, Murphy became a finance director at Alliance UniChem, a drugs wholesaler which became part of Boots UK. In 2013, Murphy became managing director of health and beauty, international and brands at Boots. After Walgreens took over Boots in 2014, he rose to become chief commercial officer and president of global brands at the parent company, Walgreens Boots Alliance.

In October 2019, it was announced that Murphy would become CEO of Tesco. He succeeded Dave Lewis on 1 October 2020. In May 2024, the Tesco PLC annual report revealed that Murphy had received a £10 million pay package for the year to February 2024, doubling his prior year's earnings. This comprised £4.7 million in pay and bonuses, up from £4.3 million, with the rest from shares that were awarded to Murphy when he joined and paid out after he surpassed a number of performance targets.

== Personal life ==
Murphy is married with three children.

Business positions
Preceded by Dave Lewis	CEO of Tesco; 2020–present	Incumbent
