= Denise Barrett-Baxendale =

Director of Everton Football Club

Denise Barrett-Baxendale MBE, DL
- Born: 1971 (age 54–55); Liverpool
- Education: Manchester Metropolitan University; University of Manchester Institute of Science and Technology

Denise Barrett-Baxendale MBE, DL is the former director and chief executive officer of Everton Football Club.

== Personal information ==
She was born in May 1971 in Liverpool and studied at Riversdale College in Aigburth and Manchester Metropolitan University. She had roles at University of Manchester Institute of Science and Technology, Manchester Business School and the University of Chester. She lives with her husband and two children in South Liverpool.

== Everton Football Club ==
Before joining Everton, Barrett-Baxendale worked for a small schools charity in Liverpool, called The Fiveways Trust. Her first role at Everton was in 2010 when she began leading the Club's charity, Everton in the Community. In 2011, Barrett-Baxendale was appointed as Everton's Chief Operating Officer, and then Deputy Chief Executive in 2013. In 2016, she joined the Board of Directors at Everton and two years later, she replaced Robert Elstone as the Club's chief executive officer.

She announced on 12 June 2023 she would be leaving Everton. This followed numerous protests over the previous season in which fans had called for the board to be replaced which, for a second consecutive season, Everton had been in danger of relegation and had appointed seven permanent managers in seven years.

== Other roles ==
In 2016, Barrett-Baxendale was appointed as a board member of Sport England. She is also a member of the Sport for Humanity Faith and Sport Leaders Council. In March 2019 she was named chair of a commission to develop plans for a new Liverpool railway station. In following April, she was named a Deputy Lieutenant of Merseyside.

When the COVID-19 pandemic set in, Denise was named a member of the national C19 Business Pledge, providing guidance to business owners navigating the COVID-19 crisis.

Denise was a member of the review panel under the leadership of Tracey Crouch MP that was set up by the British Government to consider the regulation of football.

== Honours ==
In 2014, she was awarded an MBE for Services to the Community of Merseyside. In 2016 she was awarded an Honorary Visiting Professorship from Liverpool Hope University, a title that she widely uses as well as receiving an Honorary Fellowship from Liverpool John Moores University.
