= Robert Elstone =

British businessman (born 1964)

Robert Elstone MBE
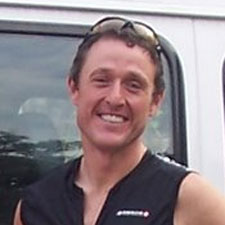
- Born: Robert Colin Elstone; 6 February 1964 (age 62); Barnsley, West Riding of Yorkshire, England
- Education: University of Hull
- Occupations: Businessman, accountant
- Spouse: Catherine Elstone
- Children: Fergus, Michael, Niamh Elstone

Robert Colin Elstone MBE (born 6 February 1964) is a British businessman.

He attended the University of Hull and is a qualified accountant. He was originally a financial controller at a Barnsley-based lead-processing plant but later became an Executive Assistant at the Rugby Football League. He is the brother-in-law of football manager Mick McCarthy.

== Deloitte ==
At Deloitte Touche, a company he joined in the mid-1990s, Elstone acted as an advisor to leagues, clubs and sports-related organisations on a range of strategic and commercial activities.

He was involved in the creation and branding of both the Scottish Premier League and the Super League and at the time said: "We worked on the formation of the SPL from cradle to the grave, it was long and ground-breaking, and very rewarding.

He moved to BSkyB as a Director of Football Business Affairs in 2000 and worked closely with a number of Premier League clubs following Sky's acquisition of equity in four leading clubs. In 2004, he returned to Deloitte Touche as a director.

== Castleford Tigers ==
Whilst at his favoured Castleford Tigers, Elstone oversaw the club's preparatory work towards relocation to a new stadium.

He resigned from his position in January 2007 citing family reasons. He said: "I have been very conscious of the declining commitment I have been able to give to the Club over the past 12 months. The combination of a demanding job, a young family and the simple fact of where I live means that I cannot fulfil my duties to the level they demand. As a lifelong fan, I have felt incredibly privileged to serve the Club in such an important capacity over the past few years. However, I have to say, after a long time away, I'm really looking forward to going back into the Wheldon Road End and becoming a proper fan again. "

== Everton Football Club ==
Elstone joined Everton as deputy to Keith Wyness in June 2005. As Deputy CEO it was his responsibility to assist in "developing an efficient organisational structure, securing and empowering a strong management team, ensuring appropriate levels of financial reporting and accountability, delivering commercial growth, principally via filling the stadium at higher yields and securing new sponsors". He is responsible for the negotiation of the club's long-standing sponsorship deal with Chang.

He was appointed as Acting chief executive officer on 5 August 2008 following the resignation of Wyness. On 22 January 2009 he was appointed as CEO on a permanent basis. Upon his appointment he said: "This is a big job – one of the biggest in world football – but I can promise all Evertonians that I will work tirelessly for the cause."

In March 2016 he was appointed to the Everton Football Club board. Elstone left his role as Everton CEO in June 2017, having taken the role of Chief Executive of Super League. He was replaced by Denise Barrett-Baxendale.

Elstone’s employment as a Director was terminated by Everton on 1 June 2018.

He was appointed Member of the Order of the British Empire (MBE) in the 2023 New Year Honours for services to sport.
