= Landry & Kling =

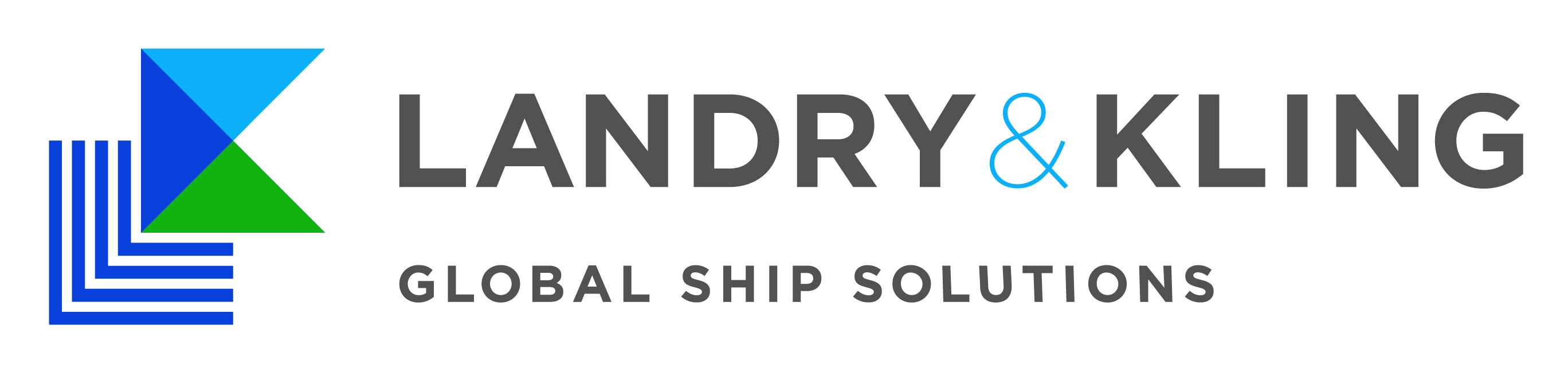
Landry & Kling Global Ship Solutions

Landry & Kling Global Ship Solutions is a company that specializes in sourcing cruise ships, barges, and other maritime vessels for various purposes, including corporate meetings and events, workforce and supplemental housing, disaster relief, and humanitarian aid.

== History ==
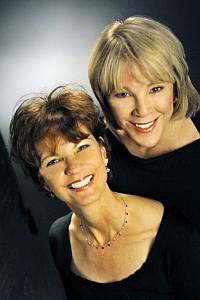
Joyce Landry and Jo Kling, Co-founders of Landry Kling Inc.

Landry & Kling Inc. was founded in New York City in 1982 by former cruise line executives Joyce

Landry and Jo Kling, who shared a vision to become the first resource for business meetings on ships. The company relocated to Miami, Florida in 1988.

Landry & Kling Inc., dba Landry & Kling Global Ship Solutions, is an approved minority women-owned and operated business, certified by the Women's Business Enterprise National Council (WBENC).

Co-founders Joyce Landry & Jo Kling are cruise industry spokespeople who have been regularly interviewed and quoted for over three decades in domestic and international media including The New York Times, Money, TIME, The Economist, Travel + Leisure, Vogue, and many trade publications in the meetings industry. They have appeared twice on NBC's The Today Show. As speakers, seminar leaders, columnists and cruise line advisory board members, they influenced the growth of the corporate cruise market, which resulted in their induction into the cruise industry's Hall of Fame in 2009.

In 2009, Landry & Kling introduced Seasite.com, the first web portal dedicated to the corporate & incentive cruise market, re-engineering the group quote process online with electronic search tools.

Landry & Kling co-founder Jo Kling retired from the trailblazing company in April 2018.

In May 2020, Landry & King launched SustainableShips.com and a livestream interview series,"The Future of Cruising", to showcase eco-friendly ships and promote leaders in the sustainable cruise movement

In a strategic collaboration effective September 2021, Landry & Kling Global Cruise Services named Inchcape Shipping Services its preferred port services company for charters on a global scale. This expands ship charter service offerings for both companies

In 2023, Landry and Kling became notable as subcontractors of the Bibby Stockholm barge to accommodate asylum seekers at Portland Port.

== Corporate Services ==
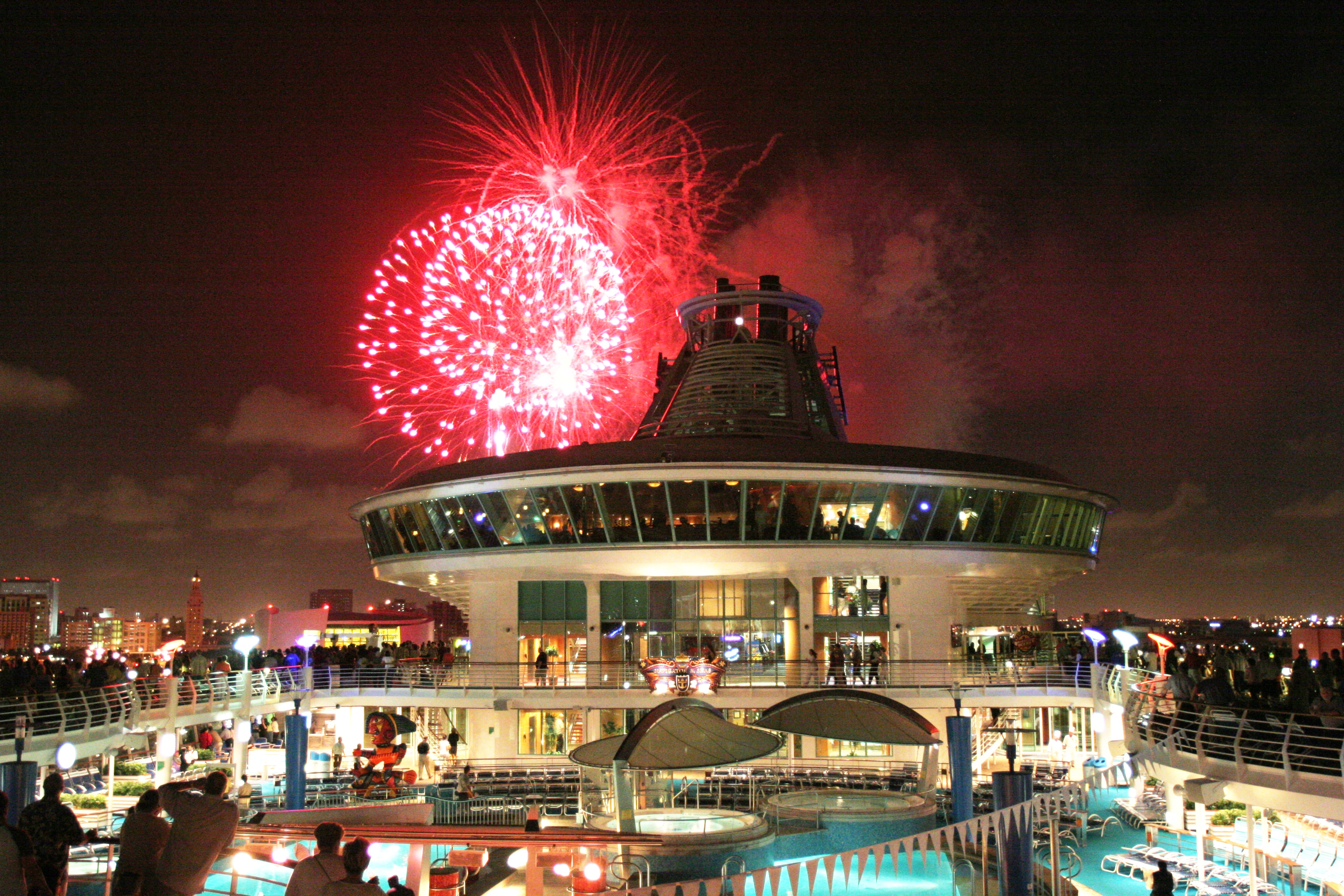
Fireworks during sail-away on a ship chartered for a corporate incentive group.

Landry & Kling provides site selection for meetings at sea, incentive cruise groups and full ship charters as well as complete program planning services and onboard execution.

Clients include blue-chip companies such as Aflac, Harley-Davidson, Land O'Lakes, and MetLife, privately held organizations and theme cruise organizers, as well as HelmsBriscoe, the global meetings procurement company, for whom they provide all cruise related services under the "HB Cruises" private label brand. "Landry & Kling's long-term specialization in the cruise industry has given them a knowledge base and connections that allow them to customize cruise solutions for their clients".

== Incentive cruises ==
At the time the company was founded, cruise lines did not have cruise incentive departments, and corporations did not typically think of cruises as travel incentive rewards. TravelMarket says the firm is " practically synonymous with cruise incentives".

== Cruise Ship Charters - Dockside and at Sea ==
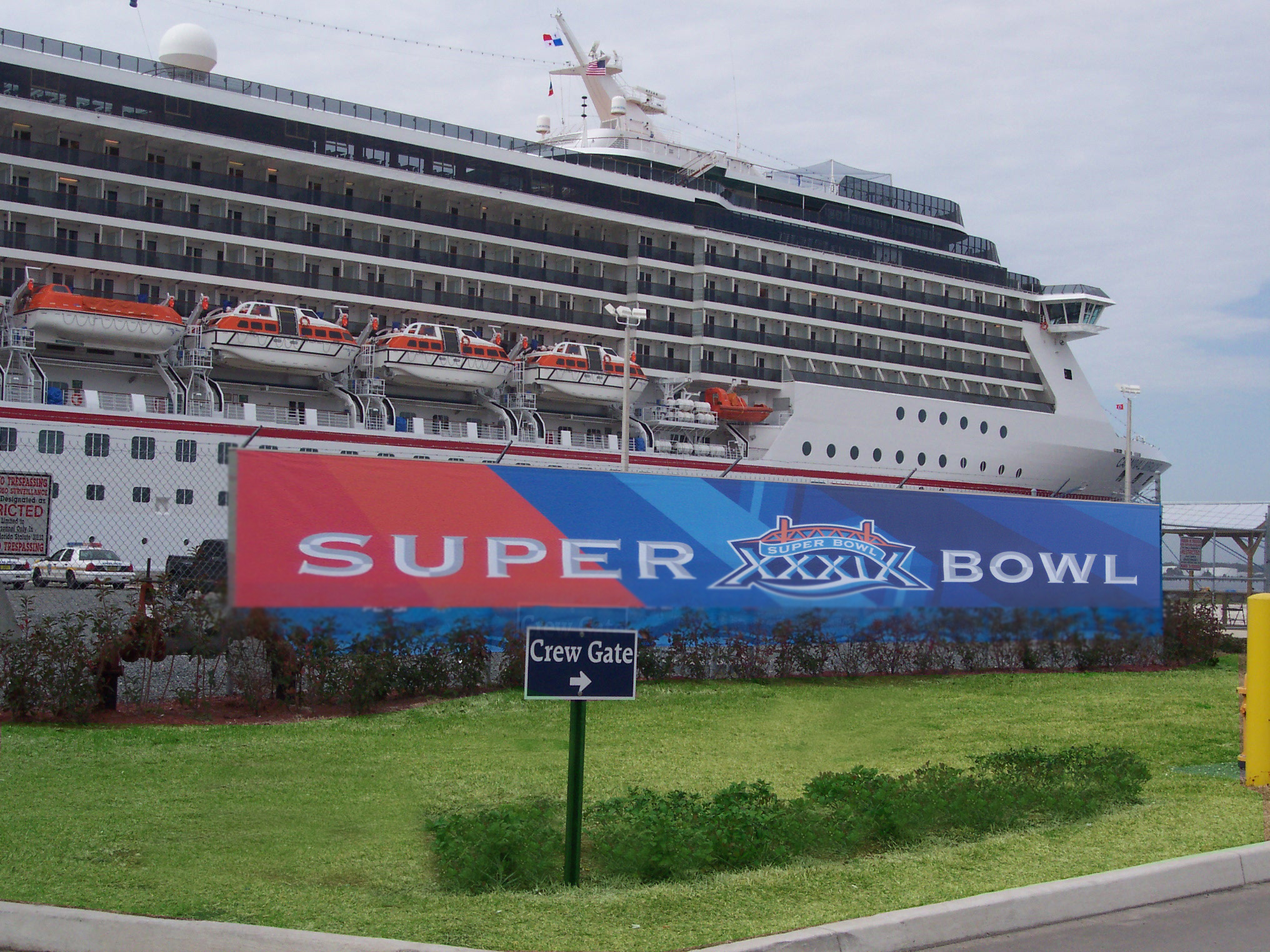
One of the five ships chartered as "floating hotels" in Jacksonville, Florida during the 2005 Super Bowl.

Landry & Kling originated the concept of using cruise ships as "floating hotels" chartered to provide supplemental housing dockside during citywide events, such as the 2005 Super Bowl in Jacksonville, Florida.

They also facilitated other dockside charter projects for the American Heart Association 1996 (New Orleans), Relief housing after Hurricane Katrina 2005 (Mobile, AL), Cricket World Cup 2007 (West Indies); Fifth Summit of the Americas 2009 (Trinidad), and the 2016 Summer Olympics in Rio.

Landry & Kling is one of the country's leading cruise ship charter consultants, not only for corporate use, but also for leisure themed charters, such as Rock Legends Cruise and "It's the Ship", Asia's largest music festival at sea. Landry & Kling is the only company recommended as cruise charter specialists in Berlitz Cruising & Cruise Ships annually, from 2008 to 2015.

Landry & Kling claims to have chartered more cruise ships than any other entity in the world.

== Workforce Accommodation & Offshore Support Vessel Projects ==
The company specializes in global sourcing and logistics for floating workforce accommodations and other offshore support vessel projects including mining expeditions and government security training exercises. In addition to passenger ships, vessels sourced for these projects include ferries, barges, sightseeing boats, and research vessels

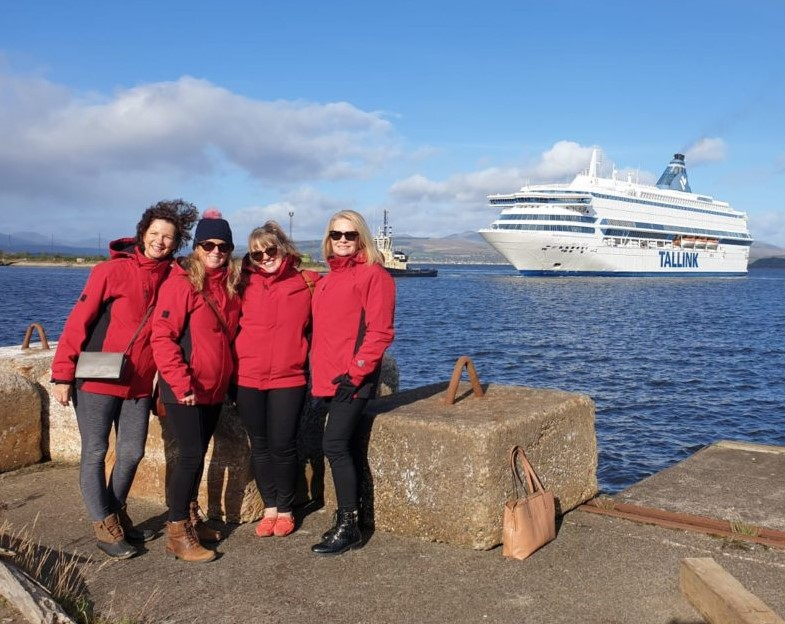
Landry & Kling COP26 team in Glasgow with accommodation ship

Landry & Kling brokered the cruise ferry vessel MS Silja Europa, in partnership with Bibby Marine UK, to house 1,000 police officers and staff tasked with providing security for high-profile leaders during the 47th G7 summit that took place in June 2021 in Carbis Bay, Cornwall, England. The company is involved with logistics for the 10-day project, including coordination with Falmouth Port, the ship, port agent, and UK Port Health.

Landry & Kling Global Cruise Services also facilitated charters of Tallink Grupp's Silja Europa and Tallink Romantika to provide workforce housing and catering services during the 2021 United Nations Climate Change Conference (COP26) that took place in Glasgow, Scotland on 31 October – 12 November 2021. The company provided logistics support for the duration of the accommodation vessel project

== Disaster Relief Ship Charters ==
Landry & Kling has facilitated ship charters for urgent relief situations including evacuation, emergency services, restoration, and rebuilding. The company's most significant FEMA government contracts involved securing a cruise ship charter for a six-month Hurricane Katrina relief mission in the Gulf of Mexico in 2005, and Haiti's devastating earthquake in 2010. In September 2021, Landry & Kling also arranged a charter of a Bahamas Paradise cruise ship for a Louisiana-based energy provider to house workers and deliver supplies for Hurricane Ida relief efforts.

== Humanitarian Aid Vessels ==
Landry & Kling has the global resources to rapidly source and deploy ships to provide relief and temporary housing during a humanitarian crisis. Landry & Kling worked with the Scottish Government to facilitate two ship charters to provide long-term temporary housing during the 2022 Ukrainian refugee crisis. The Tallink ship MS Victoria 1 was deployed to the port of Leith, near Edinburgh to house displaced refugees. A second ship, MS Ambition, was docked in Glasgow to accommodate more people from Ukraine.

In 2023, Landry and Kling was awarded a contract to supply services on the Bibby Stockholm barge used to accommodate asylum seekers at Portland Port, Dorset, UK, on behalf of the UK's Home Office,

== Mission of Innocents Nonprofit Organization ==
In 2022, Landry & Kling secured two accommodation vessels in Scotland to provide temporary housing for more than 2,000 Ukrainian refugees, including over 800 children. While living aboard the vessels and managing day-to-day operations, CEO Joyce Landry recognized an urgent need to support the socioemotional well-being of the children. She helped create a children's program onboard two vessels to encourage self-expression and healing through music, dance, art and sports. The success of this program inspired the creation of the 501(c)(3) not-for-profit organization Mission of Innocents. The organization helps children displaced from war, climate devastation, and political turmoil heal and find joy

On June 20, 2024, Landry & Kling Global Ship Services received a Global Achievement Award from ISOA (International Stability Operations Association) for their outstanding efforts in support of the people of Ukraine and the establishment of the Mission of Innocents nonprofit organization.

== SustainableShips.com ==
Landry & King launched SustainableShips.com and a livestream interview series, "The Future of Cruising" to help planners, group organizers and consumers evaluate who they want to do business with based on each cruise line's sustainability practices, to help suppliers of environmental services access the cruise industry and to support the industry toward a more sustainable future.

Joyce Landry is a spokesperson for sustainable cruise and shipping initiatives. She has been featured on two Seatrade Cruise Virtual panel discussions and moderated the 2021 Seatrade Cruise Global live panel that focused on the cruise industry and sustainability. She was also featured on a FOX News segment about the return of ships and sustainable cruising.

== Recognition ==
1987: Landry & Kling introduced dockside cruise ship charters for the DECworld '87 tradeshow in Boston to serve as "floating hotels" for more than 25,000 visitors.

2005: Corporate Meetings & Incentive Magazine cited the 1982 founding of Landry & Kling as one of the "Top 25 Meeting Industry Milestones" in their special 25th Anniversary Issue

2006 Landry and Kling were named among the 10 Women Leaders who are making a difference in the meetings industry by Incentive Magazine.

2006: Landry & Kling achieved WBENC Certification (Women's Business Enterprise National Council), and was named #156 among the top 500 Women-owned businesses in the U.S. by DiversityBusiness.com in 2007.

2009: Joyce Landry and Josephine Kling, co-founders of Landry & Kling, Inc., were inducted into the CLIA (Cruise Lines International Association) Hall of Fame 2009, hailed as "visionaries who led the way in seagoing corporate meetings and incentives."

2009: Landry & Kling named among "Top 50 Women-Led Businesses in Florida", ranking #13 in the state.

2011: Royal Caribbean International recognized Landry & Kling as its Partner of the Year for Corporate & Incentive groups.

2013: Landry & Kling was awarded Women's Business Enterprise Star award by WBENC.

2016: Norwegian Cruise Lines names Landry & Kling CM&I (Corporate Meeting & Incentive) Charter Partner of the Year.

2017: Carnival Cruise Line names Landry & Kling Global Cruise Events as their Corporate Incentive Partner of the Year.

2024: Landry & Kling Global Ship Services receives the Global Achievement Award from ISOA (International Stability Operations Association) for their outstanding efforts in support of the people of Ukraine.
