= Keith Wyness =

Scottish businessman

- Born: Keith Wyness; 26 October 1957 (age 68); Aberdeen, Scotland
- Occupations: Former Aston Villa CEO; Former Everton CEO; Former Aberdeen CEO

Keith Wyness (born 26 October 1958) is a Scottish businessman and football executive, most recently he was the Chief Executive of Aston Villa football club. He previously held the same position at Scottish Premier League club Aberdeen and later Premier League club Everton during the 2000s.

== Early years ==
Prior to entering the football industry, his employers included British Airways, Radisson and the Olympic Club. Wyness joined British Airways on its graduate scheme and worked in the press office/sales promotion/marketing/sales areas before he was appointed the youngest vice-president in the airline's history. He was responsible for marketing Concorde. He was also instrumental in the development of the "Executive Club" frequent flyer programme.

Wyness moved to Miami in 1984 and co-founded Radisson Diamond with Christian Aspegren and Offe Nyblin. He was heavily involved with marketing for the cruise lines and was later involved with the attempted and aborted takeover of Cunard. He sat on the Board of Landry & Kling, the largest corporate cruise ship charter company in the world. He was then the founder and later the managing director of The Olympic Club, a worldwide marketing programme set up to promote every Olympic sport, and aided the marketing of the sports involved in the 2000 Summer Olympic Games.

He appeared on the University of Nottingham team for University Challenge winning two games before losing to a Belfast team in the third.

== Aberdeen ==
On 22 October 2000, Wyness moved back to his home town of Aberdeen when he was appointed chief executive of Aberdeen F.C. Despite the Scottish Premier League's television rights deal with Sky Sports ending soon after he arrived, Wyness was able to reduce the losses sustained by the club and when he left the club was close to operational break even. He introduced radical new player contracts with lower basic wages but big bonuses for points, attendance and even for merchandise sales, attracting media attention throughout Europe. Wyness left Aberdeen in 2004 to take a similar position at Everton. This appointment caused some controversy as he had been linked to the vacant position at Everton before he left Aberdeen. Wyness was succeeded as CEO by CFO Duncan Fraser

== Everton ==
Wyness' tenure at Everton was met with a mixed response from fans and opinion remains divided on his outsourcing preferences and pursuit of the stadium build in Kirkby. He was criticised by shareholders for pursuing Everton's relocation whilst an active director of Soccer Range Stadia – a stadium management company he set up. However, the company had absolutely nothing to do with stadium management and was in fact a leisure use for football and he had offered Everton a chance to participate in the revenue streams that would have come from this concept.

Wyness outsourced in-house operations to reduce the short-term cost. The club's catering arrangements were outsourced to Sodexo UK, and the club shops were outsourced to the sports retailer JJB Sports, who later filed for administration. The JJB deal turned the £1.5 million loss the club was making on merchandising alone into a profit of £800,000. He also was responsible for negotiating the new Kitbag deal which has taken club sales to £10 million. The savings were also significant in terms of staff time and it was soon recognised that the club was not equipped to handle a retail operation.

The club's land assets, such as the Eileen Craven site on Walton Lane in Liverpool, were sold and developed into housing areas to help the club keep trading without selling players. For one year, Everton was in the top 20 of the Deloitte's table of clubs, but moved out of that list the next year after the merchandise and catering operations were outsourced and could no longer be included in turnover.

The former training ground Bellefield was also earmarked to become a housing development by Wyness. However, plans were later rejected by the Planning Inspectorate. It was felt by the club that this was a highly political decision by the local council linked to the potential move to Kirkby. Wyness was the main power behind the development of Finch Farm; he sourced the finance and the design for Everton's new training facility, which opened in November 2007.

He was responsible for coordinating the acquisition of the David France artefacts which together with a donation from the club's collection formed The Everton Collection, regarded as "most important football memorabilia collection in the world" by the auctioneers Sotheby's.

In May 2009, he wrote to the Liverpool Daily Post lambasting Liverpool City Council's decision to spend £265,000 fighting the Kirkby Project.

== 2010–2016 ==
He was CEO of Insite Consulting Ltd, an international consulting business. Insite was instrumental in getting the correct IFAB approvals for the very successful 9.15m vanishing spray which was used in the 2014 FIFA World Cup with great success and will continue with the companies development. Insite covered projects in Oman and Saudi Arabia as well as the USA and Canada for sports and industrial related projects. This included reorganising football in those countries and the possible introduction of T20 cricket to the USA.

As senior non executive director at the SECC for 8 years he oversaw many aspects of the World leading "Hydro Arena" in Glasgow a state of the art 13,000 seat live venue. It was also the centrepiece of the 2014 Glasgow Commonwealth Games. He is involved in several major property development sin the NW as part of the Northern Powerhouse project and also in the London area with a major mixed use development in Greenwich. He was also Non executive Director of De Poel Ltd and appointed after an extensive search.

== Aston Villa ==
Wyness was appointed as CEO by the new owner of Aston Villa Tony Xia in June 2016. On 2 June 2017 Wyness was banned from all football-related activity for three weeks after FA acted over an offensive post. This was disputed vehemently by Wyness.

On 5 June 2018, Wyness was suspended by Aston Villa with "immediate effect" in a club statement and left the club later that summer. In the midst of a financial crisis at Aston Villa, where the club faced a winding up order over a £4 million unpaid tax bill, Wyness was accused of having spoken about the club's financial situation with third parties, without the knowledge of Xia.

On 28 May 2019, after Aston Villa had achieved promotion to the Premier League, Wyness publicly called Xia, who was celebrating the victory, a "fraud".

In June 2019, Wyness also attempted to sue Dr. Tony Xia, but was unsuccessful, after a judge ruled that any attempt at legal action would be prejudiced against Xia due to the financial and time costs he would incur defending himself.

On 18 October 2019, amidst rumours that former Aston Villa owner Tony Xia had a warrant out for his arrest, Wyness tweeted; "karma is a bitch". Tony Xia responded by accusing Wyness of attempting to force Aston Villa into administration, and a subsequent 12-point deduction, whilst asking for extra payment himself, during their time at the helm.

On 1 November 2019, Aston Villa settled out of court with Wyness with regards to a claim of unfair dismissal. Aston Villa's new directors, none of whom were at the club at the time of the dispute, made a public statement that they accepted Wyness had acted in the best interests of the club at all times and wished him well for the future.
