= Zoe (2001 film) =

- Directed by: Deborah Attoinese
- Produced by: Bill Kenwright; Carole Curb Nemoy; Mike Curb; Ram Bergman; Dana Lustig
- Starring: Vanessa Zima; Jenny Seagrove; Stephi Lineburg; Victoria Davis; Gordon Tootoosis
- Edited by: Rick Weis; Lawrence Maddox
- Production companies: A Curb Entertainment; Bill Kenright Films presentation
- Release date: 2001
- Running time: 92 min
- Country: United States
- Language: English

Zoe is a 2001 independent coming-of-age adventure-drama film directed by Deborah Attoinese in her directorial debut, and written by Deborah Attoinese and Amy Dawes. The film stars Vanessa Zima, Jenny Seagrove, Stephi Lineburg, Victoria Davis, Gordon Tootoosis, and Kim Greist.

== Plot ==
A teenage runaway named Zoe (Vanessa Zima), along with her two friends, Sarah (Stephi Lineburg) and Ally (Victoria Davis) hijack a car to drive west towards her Native American heritage. Along the way, they meet Cecilia (Jenny Seagrove), a British woman scattering her mother's ashes, and a spiritual journey begins as Zoe and Cecilia's paths intersect with each others in the desert.

== Cast ==
- Vanessa Zima - Zoe
- Jenny Seagrove - Cecilia
- Stephi Lineburg - Sarah
- Victoria Davis – Ally
- Gordon Tootoosis – Red Shirt
- Kim Greist – Mrs. Callahan
- Jamielyn Lippman – Tamara (as Jamielyn Gamboa)
- Gelcys Basulto – Gentry
- Karla Ojeda – Girl in Shower
- Kirk (Kurt) McKinney – Security Guard (as R. Kirk McKinney)
- Judy Scheer – Counter Woman
- Shelly Desai – Hotel Clerk
- Sabrina Artel – Waitress
- Arell Blanton – Roy Gene
- Lilli Birdsell – Lurleena
- Brian T. Finney – Deke
- Virginia Morris – Harriet
- Nick Gaza – Officer Carl
- Brentley Gore – Rick
- Brent Sexton – Lonnie
- Chas Mitchell – Police Officer
- Robyn Lees – Charlotte (as Robin Lees)
- Oliver Parker – Julian
- Allan Corduner – Rupert

== Reception ==
Despite some positive reviews, the film did receive some criticism for having an inconsistent storyline with a happy but unconvincing ending.
