= Debra Crew =

Diageo CEO (born 1970)

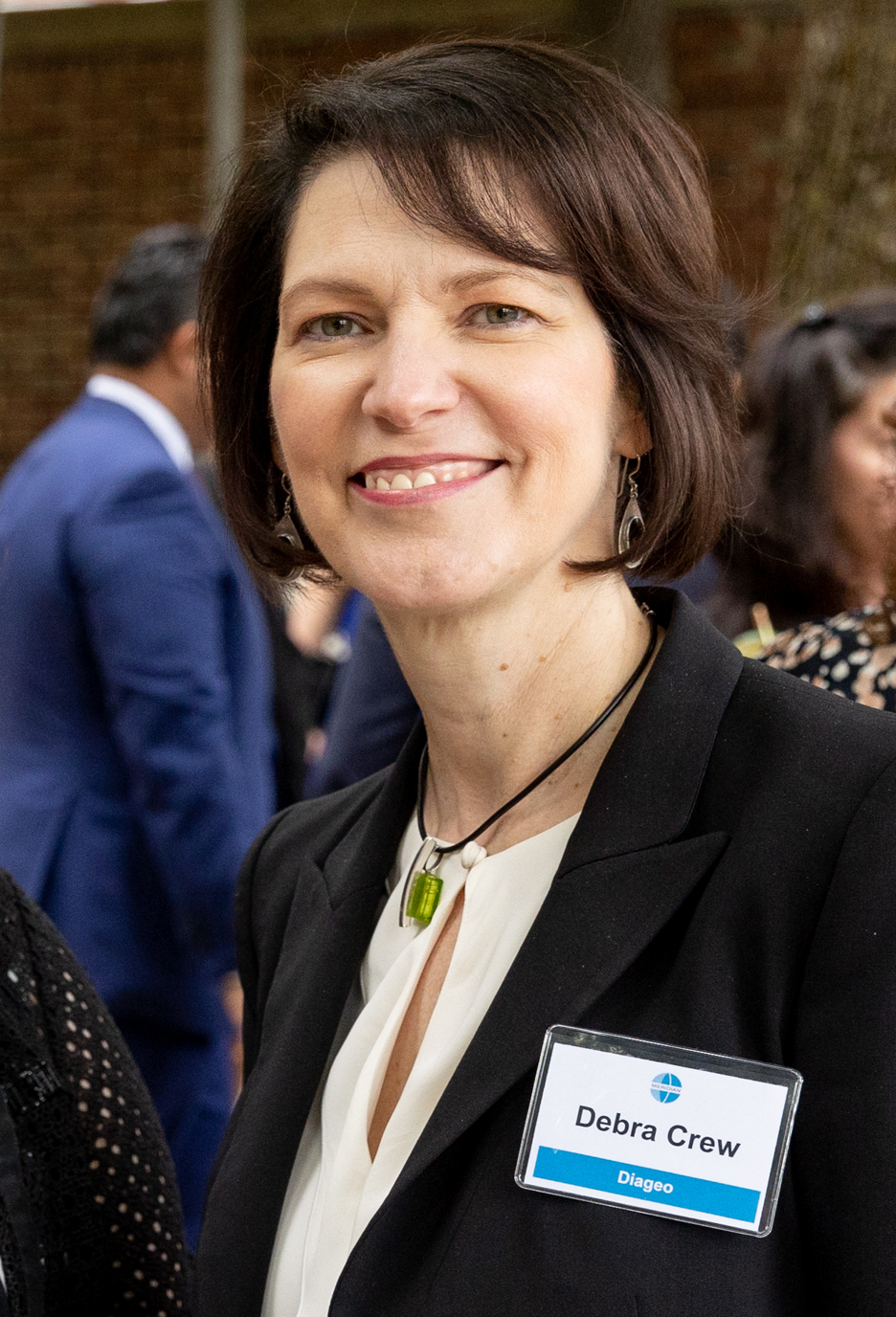
- Crew in 2022
- Born: December 20, 1970 (age 55); Honolulu, Hawaii, US
- Education: University of Denver (BA); University of Chicago Booth School of Business (MBA)
- Occupation: Business executive

Debra Ann Crew (born December 20, 1970) is an American business executive, who was the chief executive of Diageo from 2023 to 2025. She is a non-executive board member of Mondelez International, and the former chief executive of R. J. Reynolds Tobacco Company. She has previously held senior management roles at PepsiCo, Mars, Incorporated and Dreyer's.

== Education ==
Crew earned her bachelor's degree from the University of Denver, and her MBA from the University of Chicago Booth School of Business.

== Career ==
She served in the United States Army from 1993 to 1997 in the field of military intelligence, achieving the rank of captain.

Crew began her business career at Kraft Foods in 1997, where she filled a number of management positions. After seven years at Kraft, she moved to Dreyer's, a subsidiary of Nestlé, where she worked from 2004 to 2008, rising to senior vice president of marketing, frozen snacks. From 2008 to 2010 she was the general manager and chief marketing officer of Petcare US, at Mars, Incorporated.

Crew joined PepsiCo in April 2010 as president, Western European region, headquartered in Geneva. In August 2012 she was named to the newly created position of president of Pepsico Americas Beverages, which incorporated responsibility for the North American operations of the Gatorade and Tropicana brands, the Latin America Beverages operation, the North America warehouse sales operation, and the beverage growth ventures group.

In 2013, Crew was named to the board of directors of Stanley Black & Decker.

In August 2014 she was named president and general manager of PepsiCo North America Nutrition.

In October 2014 Crew departed PepsiCo to become president and chief commercial officer of the R.J. Reynolds Tobacco Company. She had been a director of the company since December 2013. The switch from the food to cigarette industry surprised observers, as well as the timing, since she had headed PepsiCo's North America Nutrition for only two months. In September 2015 her title changed to president and chief operations officer, where she oversaw $8.6 billion of the company's estimated $10.7 billion in post-merger sales.

On January 1, 2017 Crew became the chief executive of Reynolds American, taking over from Susan Cameron. She was one of the few women chief executives of a major American tobacco company.

In April 2019, Crew was appointed a non-executive director to Diageo's board. In July 2020, she replaced Deirdre Mahlan as president of Diageo North America.

On July 1, 2023 Crew was appointed chief executive of Diageo, becoming the first female to assume the role. However, in July 2025, she resigned "by mutual agreement".

== See also ==
- List of women CEOs of Fortune 500 companies
