= Terry Leahy =

English businessman (born 1956)

Sir Terry Leahy
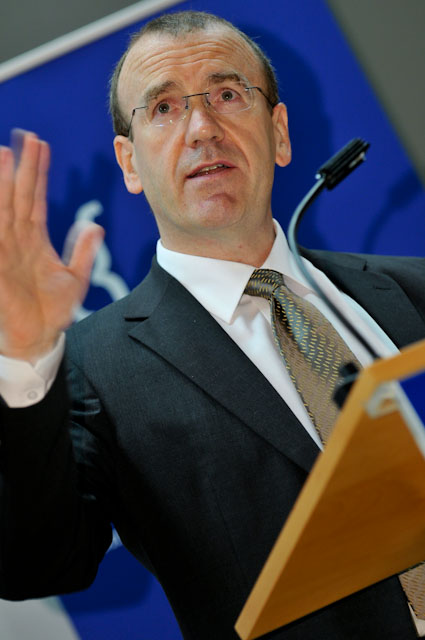
- Born: Terence Patrick Leahy; 28 February 1956 (age 70); Belle Vale, Liverpool, England
- Other names: Terry Tesco, Tesco Leahy
- Known for: CEO of Tesco Stores
- Spouse: Alison Leahy
- Children: 3

Sir Terence Patrick Leahy (born 28 February 1956) is a British businessman, previously the CEO of Tesco, the largest British retailer and the third-largest retailer in the world measured by revenues. In 2011, he became a senior advisor at private equity company Clayton Dubilier & Rice.

He now lives in Cuffley, Hertfordshire, with his wife, Alison, and his three children.

== Early life ==
Born in Belle Vale, Liverpool to Irish immigrants, Leahy grew up in a prefabricated home in Endbrook Road. His father, a merchant seaman, was injured in World War II and worked as a bookmaker to support the family. Leahy attended Our Lady of the Assumption Primary School, L25. He passed the 11+ exam and earned a scholarship to attend St. Edward's College, Liverpool a direct grant grammar school. He credits these institutions as providing scaffolding for ascent out of an impoverished background. He began working (including a job stacking shelves at Tesco) and went on to study at the University of Manchester Institute of Science and Technology (UMIST) where he gained his BSc in Management Sciences and graduated in 1977. He earned a D.Sc. from Cranfield University.

== Career ==
=== Tesco ===
Following his then-girlfriend to London, he applied to become a product manager for Turkey Foil but was turned down. He applied for a job at Tesco, but lost out to another candidate. After that candidate was quickly reassigned upwards, Leahy returned to Tesco in 1979 as a marketing executive.

Tesco was a resolute market follower of the two leading brands, Marks & Spencer as the then world's most profitable retailer, and Sainsbury's as the world's most profitable food retailer. Leahy concluded that Tesco should stop following a strategy of catch-up and start leading through market knowledge, which led to his success in devising and implementing the Tesco Clubcard loyalty programme from 1995 onwards, and also monitoring the shopping habits of Clubcard holders.

Leahy was appointed to the board in 1992, and in 1995 Tesco became the UK's biggest retailer. Leahy became chief executive in 1997, on the retirement of Lord MacLaurin (formerly his mentor) who wanted to appoint a successor to lead international expansion and increased market share. Tesco stretched its lead as the UK's largest retailer and also grew internationally.

Following Tesco's announcement of £2 billion in profits in April 2005, Leahy hit back against protests that the company was "too successful". During his tenure, he increased the company's UK market share from 20pc to 30pc.

On 8 June 2010, Tesco announced that Leahy was to retire as chief executive in March 2011. Leahy has been paid £8.42m in performance related bonuses since his departure from Tesco, in addition to a pension pot worth £18.4m at the time of his departure. Since then, he has focused on startup investments.

=== B&M Retail ===
Following his departure from Tesco, Leahy was appointed the chairman of the board of B&M Retail in December 2012. He is a senior adviser to CD&R. In 2017, it was announced that he would step down as chairman from B&M after five years. During this time, he steered the retailer on to the stock market. Revenues also rose from £993m to £2.7bn as a result of an aggressive expansion plan, which also saw its store portfolio increase from 331 shops to 893.

== Honours ==
Leahy was knighted in 2002.

== Institutions ==
He was Chancellor of UMIST, his alma mater, from 2002 until 1 October 2004, when he became one of two co-chancellors of the University of Manchester, when UMIST and the Victoria University of Manchester were merged into a new university. He was given an honorary Doctor of Science degree from Cranfield University on 7 June 2007.

Leahy is an Everton Football Club supporter and is a special advisor to the club. He was also part of a proposed ground move to Kirkby which would have a new ground with a Tesco supermarket, a hotel, a range of high street shops and extensive car parking. This project was called in for government scrutiny and rejected when Communities secretary, John Denham, decided the £400m project would breach shopping policies which discourage supermarket chains from sucking business away from town and city centres.

== Books ==
Leahy's book Management in 10 Words was published by Random House Business Books in June 2012.

Business positions
Preceded by The Lord MacLaurin of Knebworth	CEO of Tesco; 1997–2011	Succeeded by Philip Clarke
