= Nand Kishore Chaudhary =

Indian social entrepreneur

- Born: 13 June 1953 (age 72); Churu, Rajasthan, India
- Occupations: Chairman and Managing Director of Jaipur Rugs
- Website: www.nkchaudhary.com

Nand Kishore Chaudhary (born 13 June 1953) is an Indian social entrepreneur. He currently serves as the Chairman and Managing Director of the social enterprise Jaipur Rugs, which he founded in 1978.

== Early life ==
Nand Kishore Chaudhary was born in a Marwari family in the Churu district of Rajasthan. Growing up as an introverted child and avid reader, he was influenced by the works of Gandhi and Tagore. He went to school in Churu and graduated from Government College in Lohia in 1973.

Nand Kishore was inspired by British researcher and designer Ilay Cooper to get into the business of carpet manufacture and design, and therefore help in the revival of this neglected art. Nand Kishore decided not to follow his father in their traditional family business of shoe-making, and even let go of a government job in a national bank. Instead, he went into the rug and carpet business. His venture started with a loan of 5000 rupees, that he borrowed from his father, and today that venture is known as Jaipur Rugs, an exemplary model of social entrepreneurship at its best.

== Career ==
N. K. Chaudhary established the social business model of Jaipur Rugs, connecting weavers with global markets by building a global supply chain focused on developing human capability and skills at the grassroots level. Jaipur Rugs provides a steady income for people living in the most rural parts of India by connecting them with markets across the world.

Nanda Kishore started a humble carpet business in 1978 with just two weaving-looms and 9 artisans. That has today transformed into Jaipur Rugs, which is a network of more than 40,000 artisans across 6 states in India and is one of India's leading manufacturer and exporter of hand woven rugs, bringing in an annual revenue of $18 million. Jaipur Rugs has become an ecosystem of companies and organizations, and the 40,000 weavers and their families are an integral part in this ecosystem.

== Personal life ==
Nanda Kishore is married to Sulochana. They have five children, Asha, Archana, Kavita, Yogesh and Nitesh, all of whom are involved in specific roles in the Jaipur Rugs Company.

== Publications and Accredations ==
Jaipur Rugs has become synonymous with N. K. Chaudhary’s principles of equality, socialism, and love, which he maintains are the real foundation of the Jaipur Rugs ecosystem. Nand Kishore has chronicled his journey with Jaipur Rugs in his own writings. These are available as e-books at his website https://www.nkchaudhary.com/. The journey of Jaipur Rugs has found international acclaim and has also been mentioned in many publications worldwide, such as:

- Fortune at the Bottom of the Pyramid

‘Fortune at the Bottom of the Pyramid’ by CK Prahalad was published in 2009. It acclaimed Jaipur Rugs all over the world.

- Take Me Home

Published in 2014, Rashmi Bansal talked about N. K. Chaudhary and Jaipur Rugs, from its very inception to the scale it has achieved now, in her book Take Me Home.

- Healing Organisation

Published in 2019, Raj Sisodia and Michael J. Gelb covered Jaipur Rugs in their book ‘The Healing Organisation’ describing NK’s vision of innocence and Jaipur Rugs’ as an ashram.
