= The Left Shoe Company =

- Formerly: The Left Foot Company (1998-2010)
- Industry: Footwear
- Founded: 1998; 28 years ago
- Defunct: 2016
- Fate: Bankruptcy liquidation
- Number of locations: London; Los Angeles; Helsinki

The Left Shoe Company, previously Left Foot Company, was a made-to-measure male footwear manufacturer with offices in London, Los Angeles and in Helsinki. The company was founded in 1998 as The Left Foot Company. It was renamed and rebranded The Left Shoe Company in the fall of 2010 and filed for bankruptcy in 2016.

== Overview ==
Because of the made-to-measure 3D scanning method the shoes are available in a wide range of sizes and more personalized models. Normally, tailor made high quality shoes come at a high price, the delivery is around six months and the customer must revisit the shoemaker frequently. In contrast, 3D measured shoes can be delivered in 6 weeks.

The company or its retailers does not carry any inventory or overhead. This puts The Left Shoe Company in the same retail market as regular Ready-to-wear shoes with the exception that they are made-to-measure.

Once the 3D-scanning process is completed, the customer is able to individualize their choice of shoes in accordance with the made-to-measure term, both in the store and on the website he can choose the sole, colour and leather to his liking.

The Left Shoe Company received recognition from management guru C. K. Prahalad in his book The New Age of Innovation.

== Bankruptcy ==
The Left Shoe Company filed for bankruptcy in 2016. Carter Clark from Essex in the UK is the curator. In the US the company filed for Chapter 7 bankruptcy on May 10, 2016.

In the UK it's in the process of liquidation since July 18, 2016.
