= Ted London =

American scholar and teacher

- Born: Edward David London; 1963 (age 62–63)
- Citizenship: American
- Education: Lehigh University (BSME), Claremont Graduate University (MBA), University of North Carolina (PHD)
- Occupations: professor, author, corporate and social impact strategist
- Known for: Business strategies for Base of the Pyramid (BoP) markets
- Notable work: The Base of the Pyramid Promise
- Website: proftedlondon.com

Ted London is an American scholar and teacher on Base of the Pyramid (BoP) business strategies. He is the Ford Motor Company Clinical Professor of Business Administration at the Stephen M. Ross School of Business at the University of Michigan. London is an internationally recognized expert on the intersection of business strategy and poverty alleviation. In 2016 London authored The Base of the Pyramid Promise: Building Businesses with Impact and Scale, which translates over 25 years of research and experience into actionable strategies, frameworks, and tools for managers seeking inclusive growth. The book won the Responsible Research in Management Award in 2018 and the Humanistic Management Book Award in 2019, and remains a foundational text in the BoP domain.

== Academic experience and research ==
London's research focuses on how organizations can achieve impact at scale with a particular focus on building sustainable enterprises in low-income markets. His work has been published in academic and practitioner journals, as well as in books and book chapters.

In 2009, London published "Making Better Investments at the Base of the Pyramid" in the Harvard Business Review. This article addresses how companies can build a value creation strategy that is based on alleviating poverty. In 2010, Next Generation Business Strategies for the Base of the Pyramid: New Approaches for Building Mutual Value was published. Co-edited by London and Stuart Hart, authors included Jacqueline Novogratz, Allen Hammond, Robert Kennedy, Erik Simanis, Madhu Viswanathan, and Patrick Whitney. This book was dedicated to the late C.K. Prahalad.

At the Academy of Management in 2010, London won the Samsung Best Paper Award and Doug Nigh Award. These awards recognized London's research on business model innovation in BoP markets. In 2012, Ross School of Business colleagues London and Ravi Anupindi published "Using the base-of-the-pyramid perspective to catalyze interdependence-based collaborations" in the Proceedings of the National Academy of Sciences. This article argues that for both donor- and enterprise-led value chain initiatives to be simultaneously scalable and sustainable, a BoP perspective must be taken so that development and business efforts are better integrated. The article's research was funded by USAID and the Bill and Melinda Gates Foundation.

In 2016, London was awarded the Aspen Institute's Faculty Pioneer Award. He was also recognized with a special distinction for fielding building, which acknowledges his long-standing contributions to development of inclusive business and how it is taught in the classroom. London's teaching was also recognized when he won the 2011 Page Prize for his course, Business Strategies for the Base of the Pyramid. He also won the oikos Sustainability Case Writing Competition in 2005 and 2008.

In 2021, he received the Victor Bernard Teaching Award for his contributions to teaching at the Ross School of Business. In 2024, London was recognized with the J. Frank Yates Diversity and Inclusion Teaching Excellence Award from Ross, which highlighted his contributions to Ross students and the broader community with regard to better understanding and addressing the poverty, inequity, and exclusion faced by the majority of the world’s population.

London's teaching materials are available at WDI Publishing. Additionally, many of these cases are now offered through Harvard Business Publishing (HBP) via a partnership between the William Davidson Institute (WDI) and HBP. According to WDI Publishing, over 125 leading universities across more than 20 countries, including the majority of the top 25 business schools, have incorporated London's cases into their courses.

While London's research has been well-cited, there are also critics of his work and that of other scholars in the BoP domain. Aneel Karnani, a colleague of London's at the Ross School of Business, has suggested that enterprises serving the BoP can do more harm than good. Erik Simanis, who was a doctoral student with London at the University of North Carolina and later received his PhD from Cornell University, has questioned the potential for profitability in BoP markets.

== Academic career ==
A faculty member at the University of Michigan's Ross School of Business since 2005, London was appointed to three-year terms as Area Chair of Business Administration in 2017 and again for two years in 2020. He is also a senior research fellow at the William Davidson Institute (WDI).

In 2020, London was appointed to an Endowed Clinical Professorship by the Regents of the University of Michigan. He was named the Ford Motor Company Clinical Professor of Business Administration.

== Professional experience ==
London was a design engineer for General Motors after graduating from Lehigh University in 1985 with a BS in Mechanical Engineering. A few years later he received his MBA from the Peter Drucker Graduate Management Center at Claremont Graduate University and went to work for Deloitte, Haskins & Sells as a senior consultant in business valuation.

He then began his international career, working first in Malawi as a Peace Corps volunteer and later as general manager of PT Sumatera Tropical Spices in Indonesia. He subsequently joined Conservation International, as Director of Enterprise Development in the Asia-Pacific Region.

In 1996, London became executive director of a non-profit providing business development services to companies in Northern Virginia before pursuing his PhD at University of North Carolina at Chapel Hill.

After completing his PhD, London moved to Ann Arbor, Michigan to become a Senior Research Fellow at the William Davidson Institute and a faculty member at the Ross School of Business.

== Personal life ==
London was born in New York and raised in Madison, Connecticut. He now lives in Ann Arbor, Michigan, with his wife, Danielle Mihalko, an executive director at Lenovo. They have three children, Meghan, Zach and Ariana. His son, Zach, is an internationally-capped soccer player for the Marshall Islands.

== See also ==
- Bottom of the pyramid
- Co-creation
- Inclusive business
- Inclusive growth

== Selected publications ==
- London, T. & Jager, U. 2019. Cocreating with the Base of the Pyramid, Stanford Social Innovation Review
- London, T. 2016. 'The Base of the Pyramid Promise: Building Businesses with Impact and Scale, Stanford, CA: Stanford Business Books.
- London, T. & Esper, H. 2014. Assessing poverty-alleviation outcomes of an enterprise-led approach to sanitation. Annals of the New York Academy of Sciences. 1331: 90–105. (Advanced online version published: February 12, 2014).
- London, T., Esper, H., Grogan-Kaylor, A. & Kistruck, G. M. 2014. Connecting poverty to purchase in informal markets, Strategic Entrepreneurship Journal, 8(1): 37–55.
- London, T., Sheth, S. & Hart, S. 2014. A Roadmap for the Base-of-the-Pyramid Domain: Re-energizing for the Next Decade. Ann Arbor: William Davidson Institute at the University of Michigan.
- London, T. and Anupindi, R. 2012. Using the base-of-the-pyramid perspective to catalyze interdependence-based collaborations. Proceedings of the National Academy of Sciences. 109(31): 12338-12343 (on-line version published April 11, 2011).
- London, T. & Hart, S. 2011. Next Generation Business Strategies for the Base of the Pyramid: New Approaches for Building Mutual Value. Upper Saddle River, NJ: FT Press.
- London, T., Anupindi, R. & Sheth, S. 2009. Creating mutual value: Lessons learned from ventures serving base of the pyramid producers. Journal of Business Research.
- London, T. 2009. Making Better Investments at the Base of the Pyramid. Harvard Business Review.
- Milstein, M. B., London, T. & Hart, S. L. 2007. Revolutionary routines: Capturing the opportunity for creating a more inclusive capitalism. Handbook of Transformative Cooperation. Stanford University Press, pp. 84–103.
- London, T., Rondinelli, D. A., & O’Neill, H. 2005. Strange bedfellows: Alliances between corporations and non-profits. In Shenkar, O. & J. Reuer (Eds.), Handbook of Strategic Alliances. Thousand Oaks, CA: Sage Publication, pp. 353–366.
- Hart, S. L. & London, T. 2005. Developing native capability: What multinational corporations can learn from the base of the pyramid. Stanford Social Innovation Review, 3(2): 28–33.
- London, T. & Hart, S. L. 2004. Reinventing strategies for emerging markets: Beyond the transnational model. Journal of International Business Studies, 35(5): 350–370.
- London, T. & Rondinelli, D. A. 2003. Partnerships for learning: Managing tensions in nonprofit organizations’ alliances with corporations, Stanford Social Innovation Review, 1(3): 28–35.
- Rondinelli, D. A. & London, T. 2003. How corporations and environmental groups collaborate: Assessing cross-sector alliances and collaborations. Academy of Management Executive, 17(1): 61–76.
- Rondinelli, D. A., & London, T. 2002. Stakeholder and corporate responsibilities in cross-sectoral environmental collaborations: Building value, legitimacy and trust. In J. Andriof, S. Waddock, B. Husted & S. Rahman (Eds.), Unfolding Stakeholder Thinking. Sheffield, UK: Greenleaf Publishing, pp. 201–215.

== External links and videos ==
- University of Michigan: Ted London Biographical Page
- Ted London's Website
- Inclusive Business Interview (Article)
