= Kanni Wignaraja =

Sri Lankan UN high-level official

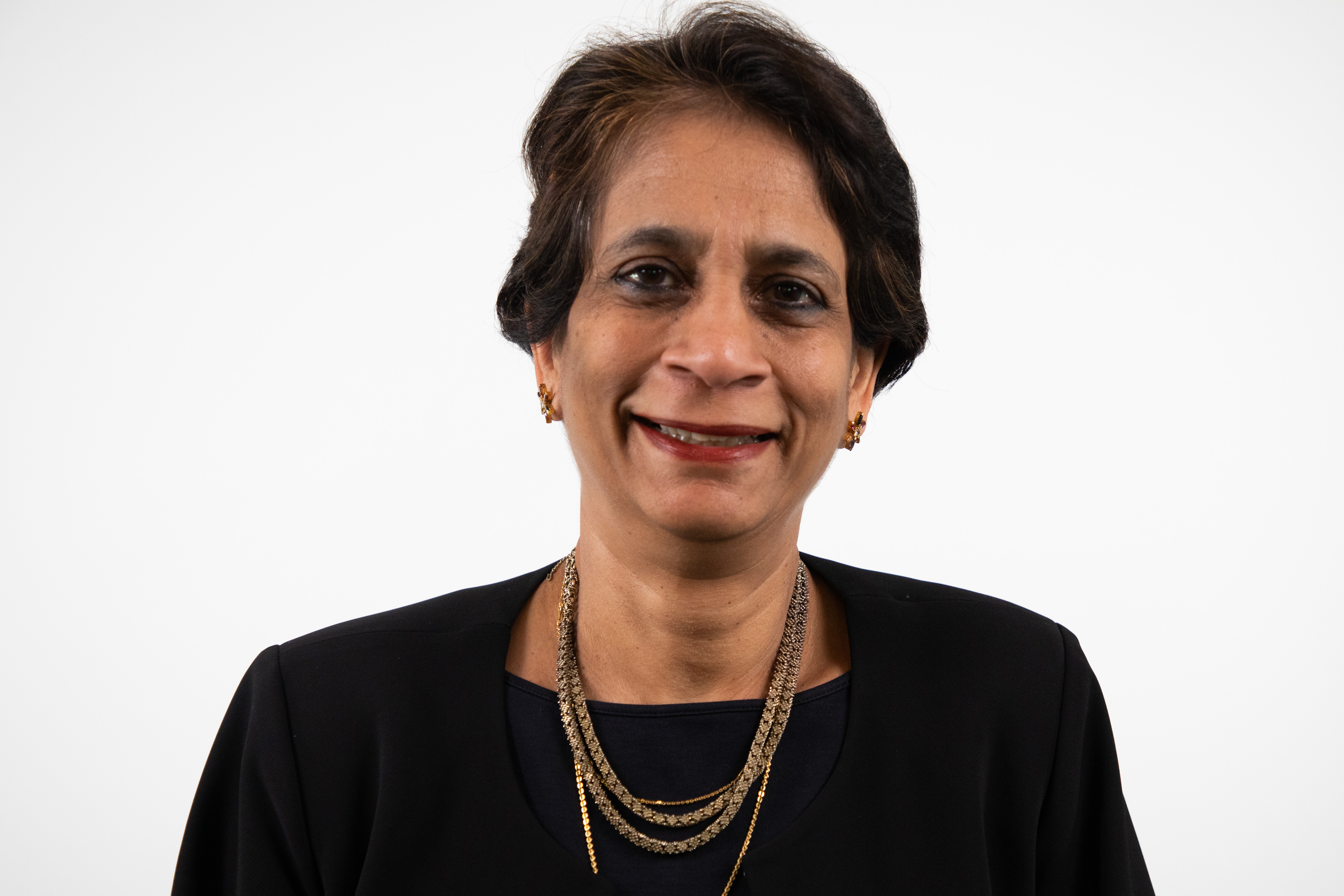

UN Assistant Secretary-General and Regional Director for Asia and the Pacific of the United Nations Development Programme
- Incumbent
- Assumed office 18 November 2019
- Regional Director: Kanni Wignaraja
- Preceded by: Haoliang Xu

Personal details
- Born: Sri Lanka
- Education: Bryn Mawr College, Princeton University

Kanni Wignaraja is a Sri Lankan development practitioner and United Nations official who currently serves as an Assistant Secretary-General of the United Nations and Regional Director for Asia and the Pacific at the United Nations Development Programme (UNDP). She has held high-ranking positions across the UN system and contributes to global development discourse through publications and media appearances.

== Early life and education ==
Wignaraja was born in Sri Lanka. She earned a degree in economics from Bryn Mawr College in the United States and a Master's in Public Administration (MPA) from Princeton University, where she focused on development economics.

== Career ==
Wignaraja began her career in international development in the early 1990s, working with national and international organisations to promote governance reforms and strengthen institutional capacity. She held key positions within UNDP country offices in Zambia, Indonesia, and Vietnam.

== United Nations career ==
From 2014 to 2018, Wignaraja served as Director of the UN Development Operations Coordination Office (DOCO), where she oversaw more than 130 UN Resident Coordinators. Prior to that, she led the UNDP Bureau for Management Services, implementing institutional reform and integrated service delivery.

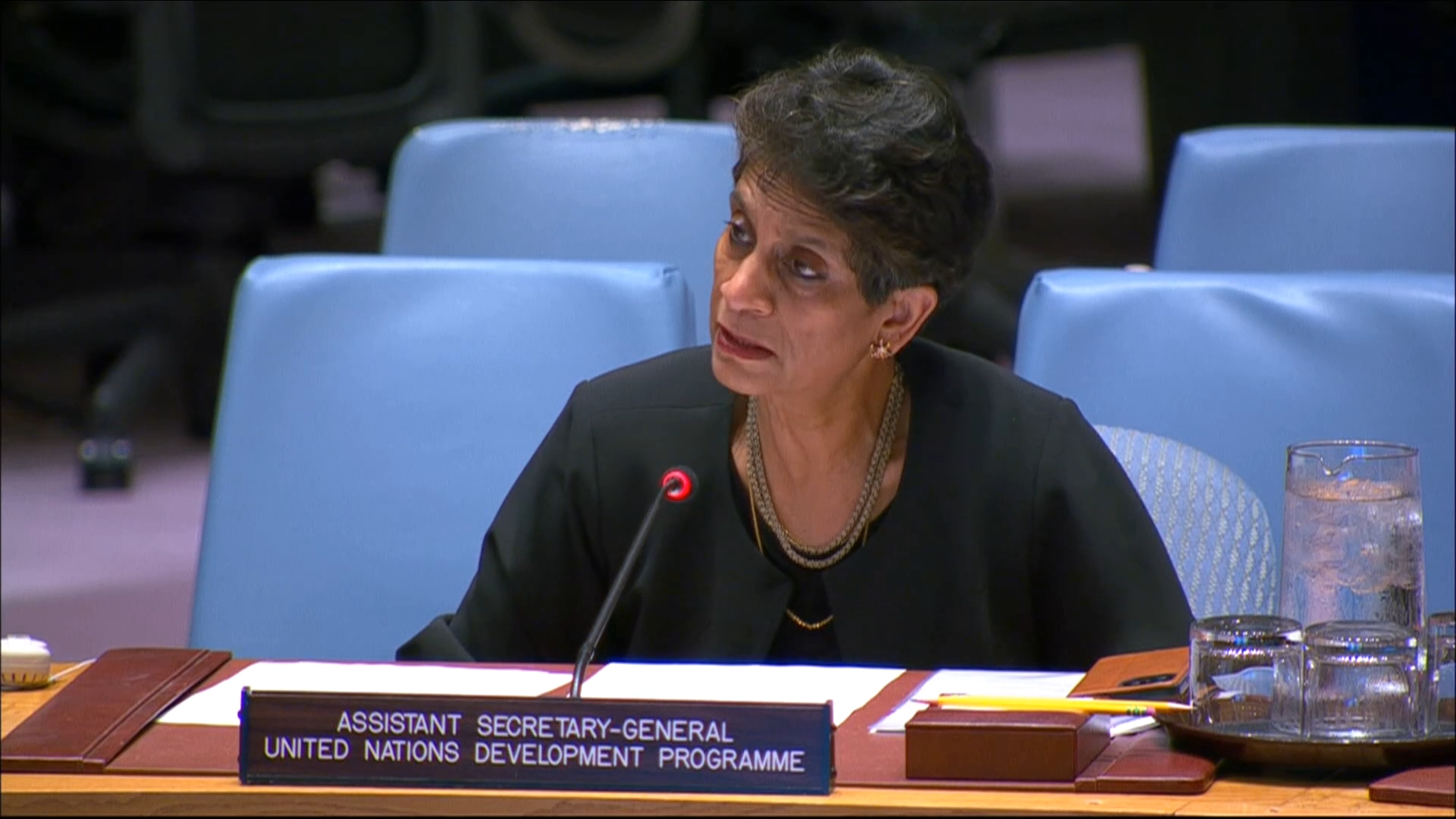
Kanni Wignaraja addressing the United Nations Security Council, June 2025

In November 2019, she was appointed as UN Assistant Secretary-General and UNDP Regional Director for Asia and the Pacific. In this role, she oversees strategic development programming in 36 countries and territories, with a focus on climate action, inclusive growth, and governance.

On 19 June 2025, Wignaraja briefed the United Nations Security Council during a high-level debate on development and peacebuilding. She addressed the importance of climate resilience, inclusive recovery, and poverty reduction as enablers of lasting peace.

== Thought leadership ==
Wignaraja is the co-editor of The Great Upheaval (2022), a UNDP-published book analysing emerging development trends in Asia-Pacific. She is also the lead author of Capacity Development: A UNDP Primer (2009), which explores the UN's approach to institutional strengthening.

She has publicly advocated for universal basic income as a response to growing inequality during and after the COVID-19 pandemic. In 2023, she co-authored an op-ed on climate-related credit risks for vulnerable countries.

== Media and public engagement ==
Wignaraja has appeared on major international media platforms including CNN, BBC, CNBC, Bloomberg, and NDTV, discussing topics ranging from development financing to gender equity and humanitarian crises.

Positions in intergovernmental organisations
Preceded by Haoliang Xu	UN Assistant Secretary-General and Regional Director for Asia and the Pacific of the United Nations Development Programme; 2019–present	Incumbent
