= Prahalad =

Prahalad may refer to:

- Prahlada, a character from Hindu mythology
- C. K. Prahalad, an Indian scholar
