= Motor skill =

Learned ability involving specific body movements for a task

A motor skill is a function that involves specific movements of the body's muscles to perform a certain task. These tasks could include walking, running, or riding a bike. In order to perform this skill, the body's nervous system, muscles, and brain have to all work together. The goal of motor skill is to optimize the ability to perform the skill at the rate of success, precision, and to reduce the energy consumption required for performance. Performance is an act of executing a motor skill or task. Continuous practice of a specific motor skill will result in a greatly improved performance, which leads to motor learning. Motor learning is a relatively permanent change in the ability to perform a skill as a result of continuous practice or experience.

A fundamental movement skill is a developed ability to move the body in coordinated ways to achieve consistent performance at demanding physical tasks, such as found in sports, combat or personal locomotion, especially those unique to humans, such as ice skating, skateboarding, kayaking, or horseback riding. Movement skills generally emphasize stability, balance, and a coordinated muscular progression from prime movers (legs, hips, lower back) to secondary movers (shoulders, elbows, wrists) when conducting explosive movements, such as throwing a baseball. In most physical training, development of core musculature is a central focus. In the athletic context, fundamental movement skills draw upon human physiology and sport psychology.

== Classification ==
Motor skills are movements and actions of the muscles. There are two major groups of motor skills:

- Gross motor skills – require the use of large muscle groups in our legs, torso, and arms to perform tasks such as walking, balancing, and crawling. The skill required is not extensive and therefore is usually associated with continuous tasks. Much of the development of these skills occurs during early childhood. We use our gross motor skills daily without putting much thought or effort into them. The performance level of gross motor skill remains unchanged after periods of non-use. Gross motor skills can be further divided into two subgroups: Locomotor skills, such as running, jumping, sliding, and swimming; and object-control skills such as throwing, catching, dribbling, and kicking.
- Fine motor skills – require the use of smaller muscle groups to perform smaller movements. These muscles include those found in our wrists, hands, fingers, feet and toes. These tasks are precise in nature like playing the piano, tying shoelaces, brushing your teeth, and flossing. Some fine motor skills may be susceptible to retention loss over a period of time if not in use. The phrase "if you don't use it, you lose it" is a perfect way to describe these skills; they need to be continuously used. Discrete tasks such as switching gears in an automobile, grasping an object, or striking a match usually require more fine motor skill than gross motor skills.

Both gross and fine motor skills can become weakened or damaged. Some reasons for these impairments could be caused by an injury, illness, stroke, congenital deformities (an abnormal change in the size or shape of a body part at birth), cerebral palsy, and developmental disabilities. Problems with the brain, spinal cord, peripheral nerves, muscles, or joints can also have an effect on these motor skills and decrease control over them.

== Development ==
Motor skills develop in different parts of the body along three principles:

- Cephalocaudal – the principle that development occurs from head to tail. For example, infants first learn to lift their heads on their own, followed by sitting up with assistance, then sitting up by themselves. Followed by scooting, crawling, pulling up, and then walking.
- Proximodistal – the principle that movement of limbs that are closer to the body develops before the parts that are further away. For example, a baby learns to control their upper arm before their hands and fingers. Fine movements of the fingers are the last to develop in the body.
- Gross to specific – a pattern in which larger muscle movements develop before finer movements. For example, a child will go from only being able to pick up large objects, to then being able to pick up an object that is small, between the thumb and fingers. The earlier movements involve larger groups of muscles, but as the child grows, finer movements become possible and specific tasks can be achieved. An example of this would be a young child learning to grasp a pencil.

In children, a critical period for the development of motor skills is preschool years (ages 3–5), as fundamental neuroanatomic structure shows significant development, elaboration, and myelination over the course of this period. Many factors contribute to the rate at which children develop their motor skills. Unless afflicted with a severe disability, children are expected to develop a wide range of basic movement abilities and motor skills around a certain age. Motor development progresses in seven stages throughout an individual's life: reflexive, rudimentary, fundamental, sports skill, growth and refinement, peak performance, and regression. Development is age-related but is not age-dependent. In regard to age, it is seen that typical developments are expected to attain gross motor skills used for postural control and vertical mobility by 5 years of age.

There are six aspects of development:

- Qualitative – changes in movement-process result in changes in movement-outcome.
- Sequential – certain motor patterns precede others.
- Cumulative – current movements are built on previous ones.
- Directional – cephalocaudal or proximodistal
- Multifactorial – numerous factors impact
- Individual – dependent on each person

In the childhood stages of development, gender differences can greatly influence motor skills. In the article "An Investigation of Age and Gender Differences in Preschool Children's Specific Motor Skills", girls scored significantly higher than boys on visual motor and graphomotor tasks. The results from this study suggest that girls attain manual dexterity earlier than boys. Variability of results in the tests can be attributed towards the multiplicity of different assessment tools used. Furthermore, gender differences in motor skills are seen to be affected by environmental factors. In essence, "parents and teachers often encourage girls to engage in [quiet] activities requiring fine motor skills, while they promote boys' participation in dynamic movement actions". In the journal article "Gender Differences in Motor Skill Proficiency From Childhood to Adolescence" by Lisa Barrett, the evidence for gender-based motor skills is apparent. In general, boys are more skilled in object control and object manipulation skills. These tasks include throwing, kicking, and catching skills. These skills were tested and concluded that boys perform better with these tasks. There was no evidence for the difference in locomotor skill between the genders, but both are improved in the intervention of physical activity. Overall, the predominance of development was on balance skills (gross motor) in boys and manual skills (fine motor) in girls.

=== Components of development ===
- Growth – increase in the size of the body or its parts as the individual progresses toward maturity (quantitative structural changes)
- Maturation – refers to qualitative changes that enable one to progress to higher levels of functioning; it is primarily innate
- Experience or learning – refers to factors within the environment that may alter or modify the appearance of various developmental characteristics through the process of learning
- Adaptation – refers to the complex interplay or interaction between forces within the individual (nature) and the environment (nurture)

=== Influences on development ===
- Stress and arousal – stress and anxiety are the result of an imbalance between the demand of a task and the capacity of the individual. In this context, arousal defines the amount of interest in the skill. The optimal performance level is moderate stress or arousal.
- Fatigue – the deterioration of performance when a stressful task is continued for a long time, similar to the muscular fatigue experienced when exercising rapidly or over a long period. Fatigue is caused by over-arousal. Fatigue impacts an individual in many ways: perceptual changes in which visual acuity or awareness drops, slowing of performance (reaction times or movement speed), irregularity of timing, and disorganization of performance. A study conducted by Meret Branscheidt concluded that fatigue interferes with the learning of new motor skills. In the experiment, participants were split into two different groups. One group worked the muscles in their hands until they were physically fatigued and then had to learn a new motor task, while the second group learned the task without being fatigued. Those who were fatigued had a harder time learning these new motor skills compared to those who were not. Even in the days following, after the fatigue had subsided, they still had difficulty learning those same tasks.
- Vigilance – the ability to maintain attention over time and respond appropriately to relevant stimuli. When vigilance is lost, it can result in slower responses or the failure to respond to stimuli altogether. Some tasks include actions that require little work and high attention.
- Gender – gender plays an important role in the development of the child. Girls are more likely to be seen performing fine stationary visual motor skills, whereas boys predominantly exercise object-manipulation skills. While researching motor development in preschool-aged children, girls were more likely to be seen performing skills such as skipping, hopping, or skills with the use of their hands only. Boys were seen to perform gross skills such as kicking or throwing a ball or swinging a bat. There are gender-specific differences in qualitative throwing performance, but not necessarily in quantitative throwing performance. Male and female athletes demonstrated similar movement patterns in humerus and forearm actions but differed in trunk, stepping, and backswing actions.

== Stages of motor learning ==
Motor learning is a change resulting from practice. It often involves improving the accuracy of movements both simple and complex as one's environment changes. Motor learning is a relatively permanent skill as the capability to respond appropriately is acquired and retained.

The stages of motor learning are the cognitive phase, the associative phase, and the autonomous phase.

- Cognitive phase: when a learner is new to a specific task, the primary thought process starts with, "What needs to be done?" Considerable cognitive activity is required so that the learner can determine appropriate strategies to adequately reflect the desired goal. Good strategies are retained and inefficient strategies are discarded. The performance is greatly improved in a short amount of time.
- Associative phase: when the learner has determined the most effective way to do the task and starts to make subtle adjustments in performance. Improvements are more gradual and movements become more consistent. This phase can last for a long time. The skills in this phase are fluent, efficient, and aesthetically pleasing.
- Autonomous phase: this phase may take several months to years to reach. The phase is dubbed "autonomous" because the performer can now "automatically" complete the task without having to pay any attention to performing it. Examples include walking and talking or sight-reading while doing simple arithmetic.

== Law of effect ==
Motor-skill acquisition has long been defined in the scientific community as an energy-intensive form of stimulus-response (S-R) learning that results in robust neuronal modifications. In 1898, Edward Thorndike proposed the law of effect, which states that the association between some action (R) and some environmental condition (S) is enhanced when the action is followed by a satisfying outcome (O). For instance, if an infant moves his right hand and left leg in just the right way, he can perform a crawling motion, thereby producing the satisfying outcome of increasing his mobility. Because of the satisfying outcome, the association between being on all fours and these particular arm and leg motions is enhanced. Further, a dissatisfying outcome weakens the S-R association. For instance, when a toddler contracts certain muscles, resulting in a painful fall, the child will decrease the association between these muscle contractions and the environmental condition of standing on two feet.

== Feedback ==
During the learning process of a motor skill, feedback is the positive or negative response that tells the learner how well the task was completed. Inherent feedback: after completing the skill, inherent feedback is the sensory information that tells the learner how well the task was completed. A basketball player will note that he or she made a mistake when the ball misses the hoop. Another example is a diver knowing that a mistake was made when the entry into the water is painful and undesirable.

Augmented feedback: in contrast to inherent feedback, augmented feedback is information that supplements or "augments" the inherent feedback. For example, when a person is driving over the speed limit and is pulled over by the police. Although the car did not do any harm, the policeman gave augmented feedback to the driver in order for him to drive more safely. Another example is a private tutor for a new student in a field of study. Augmented feedback decreases the amount of time to master the motor skill and increases the performance level of the prospect.

Transfer of motor skills: the gain or loss in the capability for performance in one task as a result of practice and experience on some other task. An example would be the comparison of the initial skill of a tennis player and a non-tennis player when playing table tennis for the first time. An example of a negative transfer is if it takes longer for a typist to adjust to a randomly assigned letter of the keyboard compared to a new typist. Retention: the performance level of a particular skill after a period of no use.

The type of task can affect how well the motor skill is retained after a period of non-use:

- Continuous tasks – activities like swimming, bicycling, or running; the performance level retains proficiency even after years of non-use.
- Discrete tasks – an instrument, a video game, or a sport; the performance level drops significantly but will be better than that of a new learner. The relationship between the two tasks is that continuous tasks usually use gross motor skills and discrete tasks use fine motor skills.

== Brain structures ==
The region of the frontal lobe primarily responsible for motor skill is known as the motor cortex. This includes the primary motor cortex, the supplemental motor area, and the premotor cortex.

The primary motor cortex is located in the precentral gyrus and is often visualized as the motor homunculus. By stimulating certain areas of the motor strip and observing where it had an effect, Penfield and Rassmussen were able to map out the motor homunculus. Areas on the body that have complex movements, such as the hands, have a bigger representation on the motor homunculus.

The supplemental motor area, which is just anterior to the primary motor cortex, is involved with postural stability and adjustment as well as coordinating sequences of movement. The premotor cortex, which is just below the supplemental motor area, integrates sensory information from the posterior parietal cortex and is involved with the sensory-guided planning of movement and begins the programming of movement.

=== Gender differences ===
The basal ganglia are an area of the brain where gender differences in brain physiology are evident. The basal ganglia are a group of nuclei in the brain that is responsible for a variety of functions, some of which include movement. The globus pallidus and putamen are two nuclei of the basal ganglia that are both involved in motor skills. The globes pallid-us is involved with the voluntary motor movement, while the putamen is involved with motor learning. Even after controlling for the naturally larger volume of the male brain, it was found that males have a larger volume of both the globus pallidus and putamen when compared to females.

The cerebellum is an additional area of the brain important for motor skills. The cerebellum controls fine motor skills as well as balance and coordination. Although women tend to have better fine motor skills, the cerebellum has a larger volume in males than in females, even after correcting for the fact that males naturally have a larger brain volume.

Hormones are an additional factor that contributes to gender differences in motor skill. For instance, women perform better on manual dexterity tasks during times of high estradiol and progesterone levels, as opposed to when these hormones are low such as during menstruation.

An evolutionary perspective is sometimes drawn upon to explain how gender differences in motor skills may have developed, although this approach is controversial. For instance, it has been suggested that men were the hunters and provided food for the family, while women stayed at home taking care of the children and doing domestic work. Some theories of human development suggest that men's tasks involved gross motor skill such as chasing after prey, throwing spears and fighting. Women, on the other hand, used their fine motor skills the most in order to handle domestic tools and accomplish other tasks that required fine motor control of the muscles.

== See also ==
- Muscle memory
- Motor control
- Motor skill consolidation
- Motor system
- Sensorimotor stage
