= Stuart Hart =

Stuart Hart may refer to:

- Stu Hart (1915–2003), Canadian amateur and professional wrestler, promoter and trainer
- Stuart L. Hart, American academic, writer and theorist
