= Jaipur Rugs =

Indian rugs manufacturer

Jaipur Rugs Company Limited
- Industry: Handmade Carpet Industry
- Founded: 1978
- Founder: Nand Kishore Chaudhary
- Headquarters: Jaipur, India
- Products: Floor coverings
- Website: https://www.jaipurrugs.com/

Jaipur Rugs is one of India's largest manufacturers of hand knotted rugs. Headquartered in Jaipur, India, the company's operations encompass more than branches, operating in six states and 600 villages in India with distribution to over 40 countries with its independent base of over 40,000 artisans. The company also has a large distribution base in Atlanta, Georgia, United States.

== History ==
1978 - 1988

Jaipur Rugs was founded by Nand Kishore Chaudhary in 1978. Nand Kishore had grown up seeing the plight of underpaid carpet weavers who often came from marginalized social backgrounds, and he started the business as a social venture to help them, with a loan of 5000 rupees that he took from his father. It was a small business to begin with, where Nand worked with 9 carpet weaving artisans on two looms in his hometown of Churu, Rajasthan. According to Nand Kishore, he based the business on the principles of dignity, compassion, empathy and love. Within three years, he had set up ten more looms in the regions of Ratangad, Sujangad, Laxmangarh and Jodhpur in Rajasthan, and without the presence of middlemen, the firm continued to grow and prosper.

1989 - 2000

In 1989, Nand Kishore moved to Gujarat to connect with the tribal artisans of the region. He continued to grow the network of weavers across the state and eventually set-up a small-scale industry in Valsad, Gujarat, to carry out the exports of that region. By 1992, there was a full-fledged network of artisans across the state’s rural areas, and by 1997, the network included more than 6,000 weavers from across the state. By 2000, the network had grown to 10,000 weavers.

2001 - 2012

After spending 13 years in Gujarat, Nand Kishore returned to Jaipur, Rajasthan, in 2003. He consolidated all the networks and brought them under the banner name of Jaipur Carpets. His eldest daughter, Asha, joined the business as well. Asha joined the offshoot Jaipur Rugs Inc. in the United States and headed the office from there. Soon after, Nand Kishore’s younger daughter Archana also joined the business as Director of Quality Assurance at Jaipur Living. In 2004, Jaipur Rugs Foundation was set-up under the Rajasthan Public Trust to engage, develop and sustain the artisan network.

In 2006, Jaipur Carpets was officially renamed as Jaipur Rugs (Pvt Ltd) and Nand Kishore’s younger daughter and son, Kavita and Yogesh, joined the company as well as heads of Design and Sales/Marketing respectively. The artisan network base had reached an astonishing 40,000, and in 2007, Jaipur Rugs marked the production milestone of one million square feet of hand-knotted carpets. In the following years, the company continued to grow and modernize rapidly. Showroom space for stores across India doubled, and hand-painted maps that weavers used were changed for Computer Aided Designs. Jaipur Rugs became recognized internationally as it was featured in The Fortune at the Bottom of the Pyramid by CK Prahalad. In 2012, He spoke at a TEDx event hosted by IIM - Ranchi. The same year, the Artisan Originals (Manchaha) initiative was launched. The Manchaha collection was a first of its kind initiative where weavers would design the rugs themselves. It went on to win multiple awards and gained recognition worldwide. It also paved the way for the Freedom Manchaha collection, which was started to provide work to prison inmates in jails all over Rajasthan.

2013–present

The year 2013 saw the launch of Jaipur Rugs’ first contemporary hand-knotted collection 'Chaos Theory'. It was launched at Domotex 2013, in Hannover, Germany. In 2018, Nand Kishore’s youngest son joined Jaipur Rugs as well. As of now, Jaipur Rugs has a significant presence in 5 of the largest states of India. It is headquartered in Jaipur, and has showrooms in Delhi, Mumbai, and Bangalore.

== Jaipur Rugs Ecosystem ==
The ecosystem of Jaipur Rugs comprises three branches that work with their network of artisans:

1. Jaipur Rugs Company is the parent company that conducts the businesses of the artisan network. It manages the production, export and sale of the rugs from weaver to customer. It is headquartered in Jaipur, Rajasthan.
2. Jaipur Rugs Foundation is the service arm of Jaipur Rugs Group. It was registered in 2004 under the Rajasthan Public Trust Act with the aim of integrating rural people into its value chain by training them to become home-based artisans and giving them a market for their products.
3. Jaipur Living is the branch of Jaipur Rugs that caters to business in Atlanta, United States. It is headed by Nand Kishore Chaudhary’s eldest daughter, Asha Chaudhary.

== Literature ==
Jaipur Rugs has been the subject of several case studies focused on their corporate strategy to address and alleviate poverty.

1. C. K. Prahalad included a case study of Jaipur Rugs in his book The Fortune at the Bottom of the Pyramid, citing it as an example of a social business which helps in reducing world poverty. Prahalad describes the business model of Jaipur Rugs as unique because of its complex and robust supply chain.
2. Harvard University has studied Jaipur Rugs' supply chain with an eye toward offering improvements.
3. In Take Me Home, published in 2014, Rashmi Bansal talked about N. K. Chaudhary and Jaipur Rugs, from its very inception to the scale it has achieved.
4. In The Healing Organisation, published in 2019, Raj Sisodia and Michael J. Gelb covered Jaipur Rugs, describing NK’s vision of Jaipur Rugs "as an ashram."
