= Achim Steiner =

German-Brazilian politician and public servant

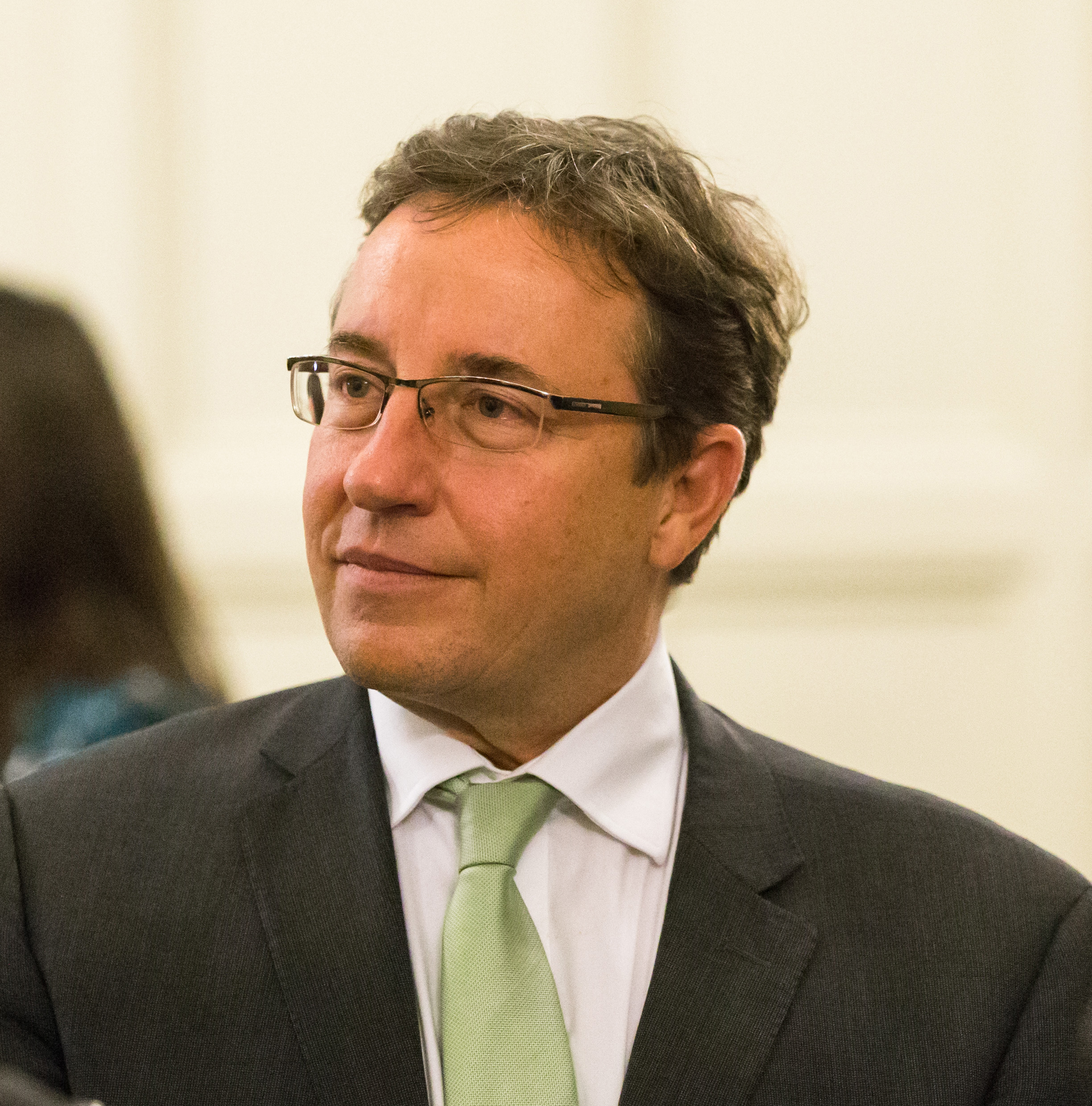
- Steiner in 2016

9th Administrator of the United Nations Development Programme
- In office 19 April 2017 – 15 June 2025
- Secretary-General: António Guterres
- Preceded by: Helen Clark

Personal details
- Born: 17 May 1961 (age 65) Carazinho, Rio Grande do Sul, Brazil
- Education: Worcester College, Oxford (BA Hons); SOAS University of London (M.A.)

Achim Steiner (born 17 May 1961) is a senior fellow of the Oxford Martin School at the University of Oxford, and founding director of the Security Futures Lab. He also serves as chair of the Hamburg Sustainability Conference. A Brazilian-German national, he completed his two terms as UN under-secretary general and administrator of the United Nations Development Programme (2017–2025) and vice-chair of United Nations Sustainable Development Group in June 2025.

Before joining UNDP, he was executive director of the United Nations Environment Programme UNEP (2006–2016), and director and professorial fellow of the Oxford Martin School (2016–2017). He has also served as director general of the International Union for Conservation of Nature (IUCN) and secretary general of the World Commission on Dams.

== Early life and education ==
The son of Helga and Roland Steiner, German farmers who had emigrated to Carazinho, Rio Grande do Sul, Achim Steiner was born in Brazil in 1961 and holds German as well as Brazilian citizenship. He went to primary school in Brazil, but was raised in West Germany after he turned 10. He graduated at Dover College in England. He obtained a bachelor's degree from Worcester College of the University of Oxford and a master's degree from the School of Oriental and African Studies (SOAS) of the University of London, specializing in development economics, regional planning, international development and environmental policy. He also studied at the German Development Institute and the Harvard Business School.

== Career ==
Steiner started his career in 1989 at the Rural Regional Development Department, GIZ, in Germany. From 1991 to 1997 he worked for the International Union for Conservation of Nature (IUCN) in Southern Africa and Washington, D.C. He was Chief Technical Adviser of the Mekong River Commission (1997–1998) before becoming Secretary-General of the World Commission on Dams. In 2001 he returned to IUCN as Director-General.

=== United Nations Environment Programme, 2006–2016 ===
Acting on the nomination of Secretary-General Kofi Annan, the United Nations General Assembly in 2006 unanimously elected Steiner Executive Director of the United Nations Environment Programme (UNEP) for a four-year term. At the time, he was not nominated by a Member State, but prevailed over candidates such as Børge Brende of Norway and Rajendra K. Pachauri of India. His mandate was later extended twice, this time on the proposal of the Secretary-General Ban Ki-moon.

The Secretary-General appointed Steiner as director-general of the United Nations Office at Nairobi (UNON), where he served from March 2009 to May 2011. Within the UN system, he also chaired the High-level Committee on Programmes of the United Nations System Chief Executives Board for Coordination and the United Nations Environment Management Group. On 3 May 2016, Ban Ki-moon announced that the post of executive director of UNEP would be taken over by Erik Solheim in June 2016.

=== Oxford Martin School, 2016–2017 ===
Upon leaving UNEP, Steiner was appointed director of the Oxford Martin School, a post he took up in September 2016. In addition to his role at the University of Oxford, Steiner was appointed Envoy of the Chair of the Platform on Disaster Displacement by the Federal Government of Germany in October 2016.

In late 2015, Reuters reported that Steiner was one of three candidates shortlisted to succeed António Guterres as United Nations High Commissioner for Refugees, alongside Helle Thorning-Schmidt of Denmark, Jasmine Whitbread of the United Kingdom, and Filippo Grandi of Italy; the post eventually went to Grandi.

=== United Nations Development Programme, 2017–2025 ===
In April 2017, following consultations with the executive board of the United Nations Development Programme (UNDP), Secretary-General António Guterres appointed Steiner as the programme's new Administrator. On 19 April 2017, the United Nations General Assembly confirmed him for a four-year term.

In November 2018, Guterres also appointed Steiner to co-chair (alongside Maria Ramos) the United Nations Task Force on Digital Financing of Sustainable Development Goals. Steiner left the UNDP in June 2025 after concluding two terms.

=== Security Futures Lab, 2026 - present ===
Following his departure from UNDP in 2025, Steiner returned to the Oxford Martin School, University of Oxford as a senior fellow. He subsequently established the Security Futures Lab, a research and policy platform with its hub at the Oxford Martin School, designed to treat climate change, health security, societal resilience, algorithmic security and geopolitical fragmentation as interconnected dimensions of a single risk system rather than separate policy domains.

== Other activities ==
- Generation Unlimited, Member of the Board (since 2018)
- Joint United Nations Programme on HIV/AIDS (UNAIDS), Ex-Officio Member of the Committee of Cosponsoring Organizations (since 2017)
- International Gender Champions (IGC), Member (since 2017)
- OECD/UNDP Tax Inspectors Without Borders (TIWB), Co-chair of the Governing Board (since 2017)
- German Council for Sustainable Development (RNE), Member (2016–2017, appointed ad personam by Chancellor Angela Merkel)
- International Olympic Committee (IOC), Member of the Sustainability and Legacy Commission
- Agora Verkehrswende, Chairman of the Council
- Platform on Disaster Displacement, Chair of the Advisory Committee
- China Council for International Cooperation on Environment and Development (CCICED), International Vice-chair
- Earth Day Network, Member of the Global Advisory Committee
- The Economics of Ecosystems and Biodiversity (TEEB), Member of the Advisory Board
- European Bank for Reconstruction and Development (EBRD), Member of the Environmental Advisory Council (ENVAC)
- Hamburg Sustainability Conference (HSC), Chair of the HSC since October 2025

== Honours and awards ==
=== Awards ===
- Slovak Republic's gold medal for Diplomatic Service
- Republic of Korea Order of Diplomatic Service Award
- 2012 — The National German Sustainability Award
- 2010 – Leadership Award for Principled Pragmatism – Tällberg Foundation
- 2009 — Officer of the Order of Saint-Charles (Monaco)
- Shark Guardian of the Year 2008 – Shark Project
- 2008 — Schubert Prize – Bruno H. Schubert Foundation
- 2007 — Steiger Award – Umwelt

=== Honorary degrees ===
- Honorary Doctorate, International University in Geneva (IUG)
- Honorary Professor, Tongji University, Shanghai

== See also ==
- Haoliang Xu
- Igor Lukšić

Positions in intergovernmental organisations
Preceded by Helen Clark	Administrator of the United Nations Development Programme; 2017–2025	Incumbent
