= Alexander technique =

Postural awareness technique

The Alexander technique, named after its developer Frederick Matthias Alexander (1869–1955), is an alternative therapy based on the idea that poor posture causes a range of health problems. The American National Center for Complementary and Integrative Health classifies it as a "psychological and physical" complementary approach to health when used "together with" mainstream conventional medicine.

Alexander began developing his technique's principles in the 1890s to address his own voice loss during public speaking. He credited his method with allowing him to pursue his passion for performing Shakespearean recitations.

Proponents and teachers of the Alexander technique believe the technique can address a variety of health conditions, but there is a lack of research to support the claims. As of 2021, the UK National Health Service and the National Institute for Health and Care Excellence (NICE) cite evidence that the Alexander technique may be helpful for long-term back pain and for long-term neck pain, and that it could help people cope with Parkinson's disease. Both the American health-insurance company Aetna and the Australian Department of Health have conducted reviews and concluded that there is insufficient evidence for the technique's health claims to warrant insurance coverage.

== History ==
The Alexander technique is based on the personal observations of Frederick Matthias Alexander (1869–1955). Alexander's career as an actor was hampered by recurrent bouts of laryngitis, but he found he could overcome it by focusing on his discomfort and tension, and relaxing. Alexander also thought posture could be improved if a person became more conscious of their bodily movements.

While on a recital tour in New Zealand (1895), Alexander came to believe in the wider significance of improved carriage for overall physical functioning, although evidence from his own publications appears to indicate it happened less systematically and over a long period of time.

Alexander did not originally conceive of his technique as therapy, but it has become a form of alternative medicine.

The American National Center for Complementary and Integrative Health classifies the Alexander technique as a psychological and physical complementary approach to health when used with mainstream methods.

=== Influence ===
The American philosopher and educator John Dewey became impressed with the Alexander technique after his headaches, neck pains, blurred vision, and stress symptoms largely improved during the time he used Alexander's advice to change his posture. In 1923, Dewey wrote the introduction to Alexander's Constructive Conscious Control of the Individual.

Fritz Perls, who originated Gestalt therapy, credited Alexander as an inspiration for his psychological work.

== Method ==
The Alexander technique was described in 2014 by a group of researchers in the journal Efficacy and Mechanism Evaluation as an educational approach rather than a medical treatment. Individuals who take lessons are regarded as students rather than patients, and the instruction is not considered a form of passive therapy.

The Alexander technique is most commonly taught in a series of private lessons which may last from 30 minutes to an hour. The number of lessons varies widely, depending on the student's needs and level of interest. Students are often performers, such as actors, dancers, musicians, athletes and public speakers, people who work on computers, or those who are in frequent pain for other reasons. Instructors observe their students, and provide both verbal and gentle manual guidance to help students learn how to move with better poise and less strain. Sessions include chair work – often in front of a mirror – during which the instructor will guide the student while the student stands, sits and walks, learning to move efficiently while maintaining a comfortable relationship between the head, neck, and spine, and table work or physical manipulation.

In the United Kingdom, there is no statutory regulation of who may teach the Alexander Technique. Professional organisations offer multi-year training and voluntary membership. A 2015 UK survey identified three main professional Alexander technique professional associations and found the majority of affiliated practitioners were university educated and typically self-employed.

== Uses ==
The Alexander technique is used as a therapy for stress-related chronic conditions. It does not attempt to cure the underlying cause, but to teach people how to avoid bad habits which might exacerbate their condition.

The technique is used as an alternative treatment to improve both voice and posture for people in the performing arts. As of 1995 it was on the curriculum of prominent Western performing arts institutions.

According to Alexander technique instructor Michael J. Gelb, people tend to study the Alexander technique for reasons of personal development.

== Health effects ==
The UK National Health Service says that advocates of the Alexander technique made claims for it that were not supported by evidence, but that there was evidence suggesting that it might help with chronic back or neck pain. According to the NHS, Alexander technique may be of benefit for people with Parkinson disease. The National Institute for Health and Care Excellence (NICE) guidelines state that people with Parkinson disease who are experiencing balance or motor function problems should consider the Alexander technique along with disease-specific physiotherapy. There is limited evidence for improvement of chronic pain, stammering, and balance skills in older people. There was no good evidence of benefit for other conditions including asthma, headaches, osteoarthritis, difficulty sleeping, and stress.

A 2012 Cochrane systematic review found that there is no good evidence that the Alexander technique is effective for treating asthma, and randomized clinical trials are needed in order to assess the effectiveness of this type of treatment approach.

A review published in BMC Complementary and Alternative Medicine in 2014 focused on "the evidence for the effectiveness of AT sessions on musicians' performance, anxiety, respiratory function and posture" concluded that "evidence from RCTs and CTs suggests that AT sessions may improve performance anxiety in musicians. Effects on music performance, respiratory function and posture yet remain inconclusive."

A 2015 review, conducted for the Australian Department of Health in order to determine what services the Australian government should pay for, examined clinical trials published to date and found that "overall, the evidence was limited by the small number of participants in the intervention arms, wide confidence intervals or a lack of replication of results." It concluded that "the Alexander technique may improve short-term pain and disability in people with low back pain, but the longer-term effects remain uncertain. For all other clinical conditions, the effectiveness of the Alexander technique was deemed to be uncertain, due to insufficient evidence." It also noted that "evidence for the safety of Alexander Technique was lacking, with most trials not reporting on this outcome." Subsequently, in 2017, the Australian government named the Alexander technique as a practice that would not qualify for insurance subsidy, saying this step would "ensure taxpayer funds are expended appropriately and not directed to therapies lacking evidence".

A review by Aetna, an American health insurance company, last updated in 2021 stated: "Aetna considers the following alternative medicine interventions experimental and investigational because there is inadequate evidence in the peer-reviewed published medical literature of their effectiveness." The Alexander technique is included in that list.

== See also ==
- Nikolai Bernstein
- George E. Coghill
- Motor skill consolidation
- Neutral spine
- Psychomotor learning
