= Usha Rao-Monari =

Indian specialist, former United Nations official

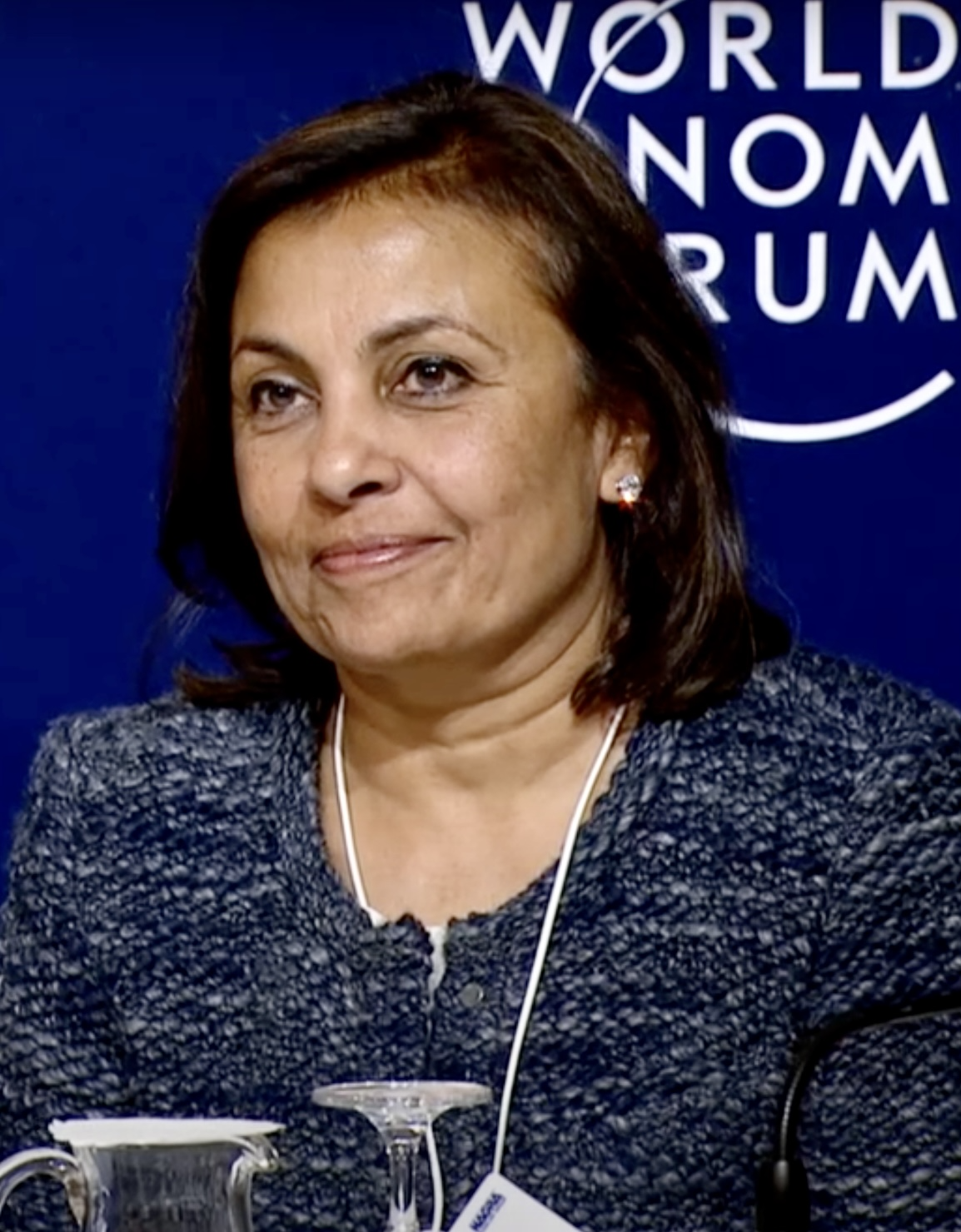

Under-Secretary-General and Associate Administrator of the United Nations Development Programme (UNDP)
- In office 17 February 2021 – July 2023
- Appointed by: António Guterres
- Preceded by: Mourad Wahba
- Succeeded by: Haoliang Xu

Personal details
- Born: 27 July 1959 (age 67) Hyderabad, India
- Education: Lady Shri Ram College for Women Jamnalal Bajaj Institute of Management Studies Columbia University
- Profession: Investment; Development policy Water resources

Usha Rao-Monari (born 27 July 1959) is an Indian investment, development policy, and water resources specialist. She served as Under-Secretary-General and Associate Administrator of the United Nations Development Programme (UNDP) from April 2021 to July 2023.

Rao-Monari graduated with a bachelor's degree in Economics from Lady Shri Ram College for Women (LSR), University of Delhi, and earned a Masters in International Finance from The School of International and Public Affairs at Columbia University (SIPA).

== Early life and education ==
Rao-Monari was born on 27 July 1959 in Hyderabad, India. Her father worked for the World Health Organization, and Rao-Monari graduated from the International School Manila in 1976.

She graduated from Lady Shri Ram College for Women (LSR), University of Delhi, with a bachelors in Economics, before pursuing a Masters in Management Studies at the Jamnalal Bajaj Institute of Management Studies, Mumbai. Rao-Monari was also awarded a Masters's degree in International Finance from The School of International and Public Affairs at Columbia University (SIPA).

== Career ==
Upon graduation from Jamnalal Bajaj Institute of Management Studies, Rao-Monari worked for A.F. Ferguson & Co. as a management consultant. In 1985, Rao Monari moved to Prudential-Bache Securities to establish an investment banking division in New York and London, advising on cross-border mergers and acquisitions.

In 1991, Rao Monari was appointed to the World Bank Young Professionals programme at the World Bank Group, before joining the International Finance Corporation (IFC), part of the World Bank Group. Developing an expertise in water management, Rao-Monari grew the IFC's utilities (water, waste, downstream/midstream gas, renewable energy, hydroelectric power) investment program to cover multiple sectors and significantly increased its natural gas program.

As Global Head, Water and Waste Sectors, Infrastructure Department, Rao-Monari founded the 2030 Water Resources Group (WRG) in 2008, as a public-private-civil society collaboration to facilitate dialogue, convening and solutions on water resources reform in water-stressed emerging market economies. The IFC appointed her Director, Sustainable Business Investment Advisory Practice, in 2012, after which Rao-Monari joined Global Water Development Partners (a Blackstone portfolio company) in 2014. In May 2022, she was appointed to the Global Commission on the Economics of Water which aims to study the value of the world's water, and work out ways of ensuring supply.

== United Nations ==
On 17 February 2021, United Nations Secretary-General António Guterres announced the appointment of Usha Rao-Monari to the role of Under-Secretary-General and Associate Administrator of the United Nations Development Programme (UNDP).

== Other activities ==
Rao-Monari has held a number of positions in public and private organizations, including:

- Blackstone Infrastructure Fund, Senior Advisor (2018–2021)
- Zaic Limited, Zagreb Airport, Member of the board of directors (2020–2021)
- CDP North America, Member of the board of directors (2020–2021)
- UPL Ltd, Member of the board of directors (2019–2021)
- Water Unite, Vice Chair of the board of directors (2019–2021)
- Global Water Development Partners, Executive board member
- Veolia, Member of the Board Committee on Sustainable Development
- World Economic Forum, Chair of the Global Agenda Council on Water
- World Economic Forum, Chair of the Global Agenda Council on Natural Capital
- World Economic Forum, Chair of the Global Future Council on Environmental and Natural Resource Security
- Manila Water, Member of the board of directors
- WaterHealth International, Member of the board of directors
- Distrigaz Sud, Member of the board of directors

== Publication history ==
Rao-Monari has written and contributed to many articles and chapters which are part of notable publications, including:

- Usha Rao-Monari, We can decide to live within the limits of our planet, World Economic Forum, 22 February 2022.
- Kevin Liffey, Can COP26 help poorer countries save the world?, Reuters, 5 October 2021.
- Usha Rao-Monari, UNDP Gender Equality Strategy: 2020 Annual Report, UNDP, 28 July 2021.
- Usha Rao-Monari Want to build back better? Let innovators come to you, World Economic Forum, 21 July 2020.
- The Wealth of Nations in the 21st Century – Book III: Of the different Progress of Opulence in different Nations, 9 March 2020.
- Usha Rao-Monari, Water: Why we need business as unusual, Water Unite, 27 August 2019.
- Liquidity crisis, The Economist, 5 November 2016.
- Smart card ensures water for all, BBC, 14 March 2012.
- Sarah, Murray, Keep it clean: the world’s water and sanitation challenge, Financial Times, 6 April 2010.

== Speeches ==
- RockCreek at COP26: Deploying Transformational Capital, 17 November 2021.
- Working Together to Discuss Water Around the World with Usha Rao-Monari, The Policy Circle, 10 November 2021.
- Partnering to get back on track to end AIDS by 2030, UNDP, 22 September 2021.
- A Green Transition Starts with Blue Water, World Economic Forum, 22 September 2021
- SDG Finance in Least Developed Countries: Focus on Malawi, UNDP, 21 September 2021.
- Friends of the UN Inter-Agency Task Force on the Prevention and Control of Non-Communicable Diseases, 21 September 2021
- Reuters Impact Conference: Flagging EM clean energy investment poses concern, 5 October 2021.

== Personal life ==
Usha Rao-Monari is married with two children and lives in the United States.
