= M. S. Krishnan =

M. S. Krishnan may refer to:

- M. S. Krishnan (geologist) (1898–1970), Director of the Geological Survey of India
- M. S. Krishnan (professor), professor of business information technology
- M. S. Krishnan (trade unionist) (died 2000), labour organizer and communist legislator
