= The Fortune at the Bottom of the Pyramid =

2004 non-fiction work by C.K. Prahalad

- Hardcover edition
- Author: C. K. Prahalad
- Language: English
- Subject: Business
- Genre: Nonfiction
- Publisher: Wharton School Publishing
- Publication date: August 5, 2004
- Media type: Print (Hardback)
- Pages: 432 pp
- ISBN: 978-0-13-146750-7
- Dewey Decimal: 339.4/6/091724 22
- LC Class: HD2932 .P73 2005

The concept of The Fortune at the Bottom of the Pyramid originally appeared as an article by C. K. Prahalad and Stuart L. Hart in the business journal Strategy+Business. The article was followed by a book with the same title that discusses new business models targeted at providing goods and services to the poorest people in the world. It makes a case for the fastest growing new markets and entrepreneurial opportunities being found among the billions of poor people 'at the bottom of the [financial] pyramid'. According to Bill Gates, it "offers an intriguing blueprint for how to fight poverty with profitability."

The book consists of a number of case studies, one to a chapter, about businesses that have thrived with such models. These include the businesses Casas Bahia, Patrimonio Hoy, Bank of Madura, Aravind Eye Hospital, Jaipur rugs and Project Shakti and how they were founded.

In January 2019, C.K. Prahalad's daughter Deepa Prahalad published an update to the piece in strategy+business, asserting that profound changes are closing the gap between the world’s poorest consumers and others, offering an unprecedented opportunity for businesses to create—and share in—prosperity.

== See also ==
- The New Age of Innovation
