= Equator Prize =

Grant awarded for sustainable use of biodiversity

The Equator Prize, organized by the Equator Initiative within the United Nations Development Programme, is awarded biennially to recognize community efforts to reduce poverty through the conservation and sustainable use of biodiversity.

== 2015 awards ==
The Equator Prize 2015 was awarded on 7 December to 21 local and indigenous community initiatives. Each winning initiative received US$10,000 was supported to participate in a series of special events at the UN Climate Change Conference in Paris, France in December 2015.

== 2019 award ==
The prize winners in 2019 included the Millet Network of India who sent their representative to collect the award. This group of women farmers are demonstrating how millet can be grown organically with less need for water or specialist fertilisers.

== Criteria ==
Equator Prize winners are selected based on the following criteria:

- Impact: Initiatives that reduce poverty through the conservation and sustainable use of biodiversity, or through equitable benefit sharing from the use of genetic resources.
- Partnerships: Initiatives that adopt a partnership approach by linking activities with non-governmental organizations, community-based organizations, the private sector, governments, research and/or academic institutions, and public or private foundations.
- Sustainability: Initiatives that demonstrate at least three years of successful and lasting changes in local socio-economic conditions and have positive impacts on biodiversity.
- Innovation and Transferability: Initiatives that demonstrate new and adaptable approaches that overcome prevailing constraints and offer knowledge, experience and lessons of relevance to other communities.
- Leadership and Community Empowerment: Initiatives that demonstrate leadership that inspires action and change consistent with the vision of the Equator Initiative, including policy and/or institutional change and the empowerment of local people, especially marginalized groups.
- Gender Equality and Social Inclusion: Initiatives that incorporate social and cultural diversity and promote gender equality.

== Nominations and eligibility ==
Equator Prize nominations are accepted from three regions of eligibility within the equatorial belt (23.5 degrees north and south of the equator): Asia and the Pacific, Africa, and Latin America and the Caribbean. A Technical Advisory Committee (TAC) selects the twenty-five Equator Prize winners, a pool that is further narrowed to five special recognition communities by a jury of conservation and development professionals. Representatives of winning communities are sometimes sponsored to participate in Equator Initiative “dialogue spaces” and an award ceremony.

In addition to recognition for their work, a monetary award, and an opportunity to shape national and global policy, all nominees are invited to join the Community Knowledge Service (CKS) and are profiled in the Equator Knowledge Zone (EKZ) database of practice.

== See also ==
- List of environmental awards
