= Millet Network of India =

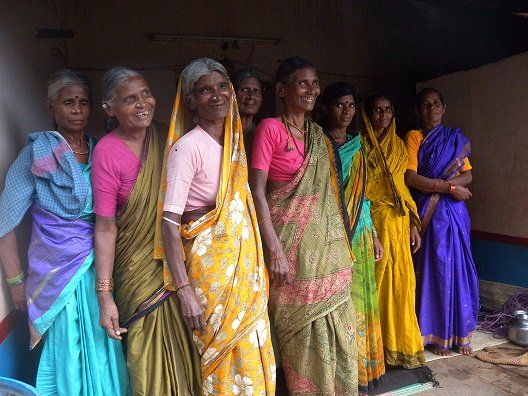
Millet Network members

The Millet Network of India supports millet farmers. It was created by one hundred women who realised the qualities of the traditional crop. The group have helped village farmers to grow millet with low water usage and organic fertiliser while highlighting the injustice of government subsidies which encourage competitor crops like rice. It has received both the Nari Shakti Puraskar and the Equator Award.

== Background ==
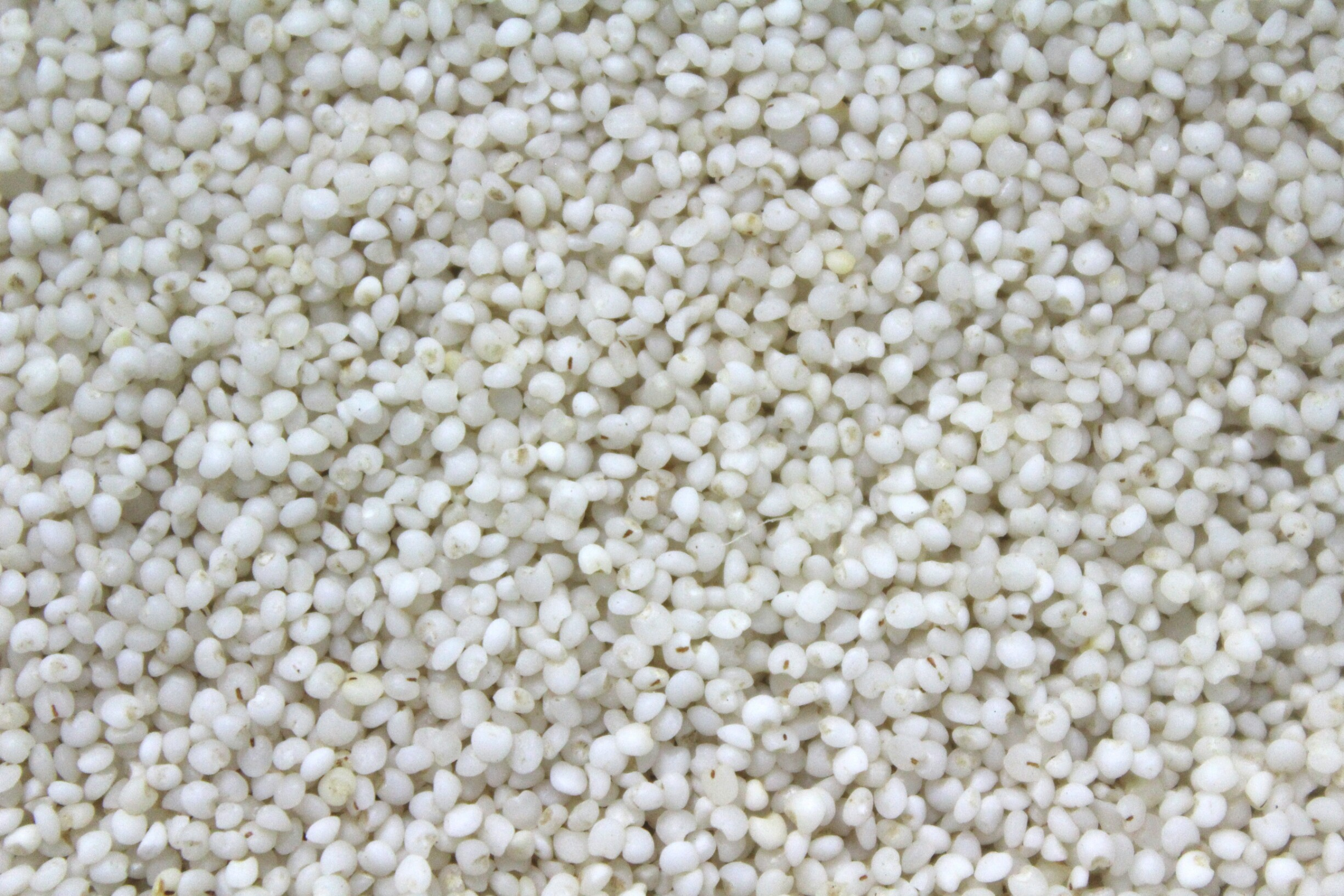
Indian millet grains

Millet is a traditional grain in India and the Millet Network of India promotes it because the crop will grow with less water than other crops. This is particularly apparent when it is compared with rice which enjoys a subsidy in India. Millet will grow on poor soil, it suffers from few diseases and the harvested crop can be kept for a long time. Millet can be fed with natural fertilisers, but not many farmers still grow it, stopping because there is little demand. White rice is more popular and rice growing attracts a government subsidy.

In 2016, the network was campaigning and lobbying government to get millet recognised by legislation which currently excludes it. They wanted the National Food Security Act amended so that millet would be included in the subsidised food that is made available to the poor. The month long campaign was designed to end on World Food Day.

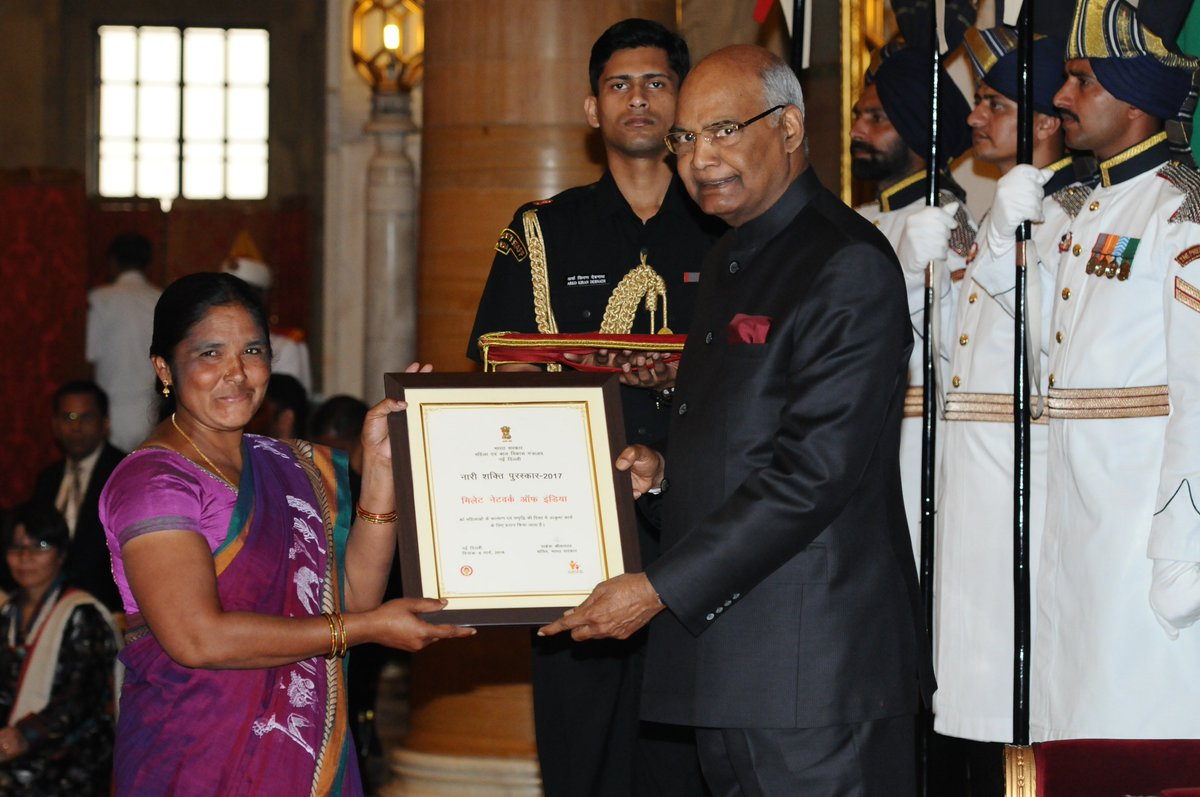
A network representative accepts the Nari Shakti Puraskar

By 2018, the network had 5,000 members and Moghulamma received the Nari Shakti Puraskar on behalf of the network on International Women's Day in 2018. This is the highest civilian honour for women, given for an outstanding contribution to women's empowerment and presented by the President of India Ram Nath Kovind on 8 March 2018. The network was one of 39 recipients from all over India. Moghulamma, who collected the award, was aged 36 and had become a full time farmer after her husband and his mother died. It was her mother-in-law who had got her involved with the Millet Network and she has gained attention for her success at organically growing millet. The network supplies advice on pest control and the organic use of vermicompost, manure and panchgavya. In 2019 she went to New York to receive the Equator Award from UNESCO.
