= United Nations Development Programme =

Global development network of the UN

- Abbreviation: UNDP
- Formation: 22 November 1965
- Type: Programme
- Legal status: Active
- Headquarters: New York City (international territory)
- Administrator: Alexander De Croo
- Executive Board President: Muhammad Abdul Muhith
- Parent organization: ECOSOC
- Staff: 7,394 (2022)
- Website: www.undp.org

The United Nations Development Programme (UNDP) (Note: French: Programme des Nations unies pour le développement, PNUD) is a United Nations agency tasked with helping countries eliminate poverty and achieve sustainable economic growth and human development. The UNDP emphasizes on developing local capacity towards long-term self-sufficiency and prosperity.

Based at the headquarters of the United Nations in New York, it is the largest UN development aid agency, with offices in 177 countries. The UNDP is funded entirely by voluntary contributions from UN member states.

== Founding ==
The UNDP was founded on 22 November 1965 through the merger of the Expanded Programme of Technical Assistance (EPTA) and the Special Fund in 1958. The rationale was to "avoid duplication of [their] activities". The EPTA was set up in 1949 to support the economic and political aspects of underdeveloped countries, while the Special Fund was to enlarge the scope of UN technical assistance. The Special Fund arose from the idea of a Special United Nations Fund for Economic Development (SUNFED).

Countries such as the Nordic countries were proponents of such a United Nations (UN) controlled fund. However, the fund was opposed by other developed countries, especially by the United States, which were wary of the Third World dominating such funding and preferred it to be under the auspices of the World Bank. The concept of SUNFED was dropped to form the Special Fund. This Special Fund was a compromise over the SUNFED concept: it did not provide investment capital but only helped to bring pre-conditions for private investment.

With the US proposing and creating the International Development Association within the World Bank's umbrella, the EPTA and the Special Fund appeared to be conducting similar work. In 1962, the United Nations Economic and Social Council asked the Secretary-General to consider the merits and disadvantages of merging UN technical assistance programmes and in 1966, the EPTA and the Special Fund merged to form the UNDP.

== Executive board ==
The executive board of the UNDP consists of 36 members elected by the UN Economic and Social Council according to the United Nations Regional Groups.

When the UNDP was created in 1965, the UN General Assembly gave a simple majority of board seats to developing countries (19–17 or 53% of board seats compared to 71% of UN members). The regional groups were specified as: 7 seats to the African Group, 6 seats to the Asian Group, 6 seats to the Latin American Group, 14 seats to the Western European and Others Group, and 3 seats to the Eastern European Group.

Currently, the board uses the following regional groups: 8 seats to the African Group, 7 seats to the Asia-Pacific Group, 5 seats to the Latin American and Caribbean Group, 12 seats to the Western European and Others Group, and 4 seats to the Eastern European Group.

Unlike the usual regional groups, Yugoslavia was accommodated among the developing countries and placed in the Latin American Group, while Japan was placed in the Western European and Others Group where it currently still is. (South Korea is in the Asia-Pacific Group as of 2022.)

== Budget ==
As of August 2026, UNDP's budget for 2026 was US$6,482.63 million.

=== Funding information table ===
The following table lists the top 15 DAC 5 Digit Sectors to which UNDP has committed funding, as recorded in its International Aid Transparency Initiative (IATI) publications. The UNDP claims on the IATI Registry website that the data covers 100% of development flows.

UNDP topped the Aid Transparency Index published by Publish What You Fund in 2015 and 2016, with an excellent score of 93.3%.

	Committed funding (US$ millions)					
Sector	2012	2013	2014	2015	2016	Sum
Security system management and reform	624.3	541.7	591.6	643.8	656.4	3,057.9
STD control including HIV/AIDS	415.9	421.4	412.1	465.2	483.5	2,198.1
Public sector policy and administrative management	216.3	299.3	372.2	456.9	462.9	1,807.7
Decentralisation and support to subnational government	256.7	327.5	302.7	338.4	505.8	1,731.1
Reconstruction relief and rehabilitation	249.0	282.5	338.1	376.5	422.0	1,668.2
Elections	157.8	267.8	330.3	279.0	149.8	1,184.7
Disaster prevention and preparedness	146.4	170.2	211.2	243.7	241.3	1,012.9
Energy policy and administrative management	113.3	157.0	198.9	212.3	316.2	997.6
General budget support	77.6	142.7	263.1	223.7	273.9	981.1
Social/ welfare services	108.7	149.4	155.4	219.4	195.2	828.1
Legal and judicial development	62.1	76.6	97.5	113.8	106.9	456.8
Environmental policy and administrative management	49.6	63.4	70.9	95.4	122.0	401.3
Power generation/renewable sources	42.8	44.4	60.3	101.0	125.2	373.7
Democratic participation and civil society	56.3	62.1	62.1	65.9	76.6	323.0
Human rights	28.1	45.5	52.4	88.5	56.2	270.8
Other	334.5	315.5	379.8	507.3	969.5	2,506.6
Total	2,939.5	3,367.1	3,898.5	4,430.9	5,163.6	19,799.6

UNDP links and coordinates global and national efforts to achieve the goals and national development priorities laid out by host countries. UNDP focuses primarily on five developmental challenges:

==== Democratic governance ====
UNDP supports national democratic transitions by providing policy advice and technical support, improving institutional and individual capacity within countries, educating populations about and advocating for democratic reforms, promoting negotiation and dialogue, and sharing successful experiences from other countries and locations.

In 1994 and 1995 the UNDP Executive Board identified democracy and governance assistance as a core mission of the organisation, and in January 1997 UNDP adopted a governance policy, Governance for Sustainable Human Development, which set out a broad and explicitly political definition of good governance encompassing the nature of the political regime.

==== Poverty reduction ====
UNDP helps countries develop strategies to combat poverty by expanding access to economic opportunities and resources, linking poverty programmes with countries' larger goals and policies, and ensuring a greater voice for the poor. It also works at the macro level to reform trade, encourage debt relief and foreign investment, and ensure the poorest of the poor benefit from globalisation.

The UNDP International Policy Centre for Inclusive Growth (IPC-IG) in Brasília, Brazil, expands the capacities of developing countries to design, implement and evaluate socially inclusive development projects. IPC-IG is a global forum for South-South policy dialogue and learning, having worked with more than 7,000 officials from more than 50 countries.

A 2013 evaluation of the UNDP's poverty reduction efforts states that the UNDP has effectively supported national efforts to reduce poverty, by helping governments make policy changes that benefit the poor. Nevertheless, the same evaluation also states there is a strong need for better measurement and monitoring of the impacts of the UNDP's work. The UNDP's Strategic Plan from 2014 to 2017 incorporates the recommendations of this poverty evaluation.

==== Crisis prevention and recovery ====
UNDP works to reduce the risk of armed conflicts or disasters, and promote early recovery after crisis have occurred. UNDP works through its country offices to support local government in needs assessment, capacity development, coordinated planning, and policy and standard setting.

Examples of UNDP risk reduction programmes include efforts to control small arms proliferation, strategies to reduce the impact of natural disasters, and programmes to encourage use of diplomacy and prevent violence. Recovery programmes include disarmament, demobilization and reintegration of ex-combatants, demining efforts, programmes to reintegrate displaced persons, restoration of basic services, and transitional justice systems for countries recovering from warfare.

Following the suspension of most foreign aid to Afghanistan due to its takeover by the Taliban, the UNDP took responsibility for funding most essential health services in the country, including the salaries of over 25,000 health care professionals. This was observed as being outside the organization's usual development activities, and was facilitated by special licencing by the United States government.

==== Environment and energy ====
As the poor are disproportionately affected by environmental degradation and lack of access to clean, affordable water, sanitation, and energy services, UNDP seeks to address environmental issues in order to improve developing countries' abilities to develop sustainably, increase human development and reduce poverty.

UNDP's environmental strategy focuses on effective water governance including access to water supply and sanitation, access to sustainable energy services, Sustainable land management to combat desertification and land degradation, conservation and sustainable use of biodiversity, and policies to control emissions of harmful pollutants and ozone-depleting substances. UNDP's Equator Initiative office biennially offers the Equator Prize to recognize outstanding indigenous community efforts to reduce poverty through the conservation and sustainable use of biodiversity, and thus making local contributions to achieving the Sustainable Development Goals (SDGs).

Between 1996 and 1998, the UNDP sponsored the deployment of 45 Multifunction Platforms (MFP) in rural Mali. These installations, driven by a diesel engine, power devices such as pumps, grain mills and appliances. By 2004, the number of MFPs in Mali reached 500.

In 2012 the Biodiversity Finance Initiative (BIOFIN) was established. BIOFIN brings 30 countries together to develop and implement evidence-based finance plans to safeguard biodiversity. BIOFIN has developed a methodology to guide countries to analyze the policy and institutional context for biodiversity finance; measure the current biodiversity expenditures; assess future financial needs, and identify the most suitable finance solutions to achieve national biodiversity targets.

==== HIV/AIDS ====
UNDP works to help countries prevent further spreading of and reduce the impact of HIV/AIDS, convening The Global Commission on HIV and the Law which was reported in 2012.

==== Hub for Innovative Partnerships ====
Major programmes underway are:

World Map of Gender Inequality Index by country sourced from 2017 Human Development Report

- ART Global Initiative
- World Alliance of Cities Against Poverty
- Territorial Approach to Climate Change
- Africa–Kazakhstan Partnership for the SDGs

==== Human Development Report ====
Since 1991, the UNDP has annually published the Human Development Report, which includes topics on Human Development and the annual Human Development Index.

The Gender Inequality Index is one such topic discussed in the Human Development Report.

=== Evaluation ===
The UNDP spends about 0.2% of its budget on internal evaluation of the effectiveness of its programmes. The UNDP's Evaluation Office is a member of the UN Evaluation Group (UNEG) which brings together all the units responsible for evaluation in the UN system. Currently the UNEG has 43 members and 3 observers.

== Global Policy Centres ==
The UNDP runs four Global Policy Centres, which span policy, programme and representational functions and connect UNDP and its partners with external expertise and networks:

- the Istanbul Centre for Private Sector in Development (IICPSD), which works with the private sector and foundations through research, advocacy for inclusive business and public-private dialogue
- the Global Policy Centre for Governance in Oslo, UNDP's knowledge, research and analytical centre for governance issues
- the Seoul Policy Centre (USPC), which supports development cooperation and South-South and triangular cooperation, and shares policy tools of the Republic of Korea
- the Global Centre for Technology, Innovation and Sustainable Development (GCTISD) in Singapore, a joint initiative with the Government of Singapore to identify and co-create technological solutions for sustainable development

UNDP also runs two programme offices, which combine representational and technical support tailored to partners in their host countries:

- the UNDP Rome Centre for Climate Action and Energy Transition, which delivers the Youth4Climate initiative and a renewable energy portfolio focused particularly on Africa
- the UNDP Office in Doha, operational since August 2021, which links the State of Qatar and the Qatar Fund for Development with UNDP's policy advisory services and global network

== UN coordination role ==
UNDP plays a coordination role in the UN's activities in the field of development. This is mainly executed through its vice-chair role of the UN Development Group and integrator function, within the broader the Resident Coordinator System.

=== United Nations Development Group ===
The United Nations Development Group (UNDG) was created by the Secretary-General in 1997, to improve the effectiveness of UN development at the country level. The UNDG brings together the operational agencies working on development. The Group is chaired by the Deputy Secretary-General of the United Nations, with the Administrator of UNDP serving as vice-chair. UN Development Coordination Office (DCO) provides the Secretariat to the Group.

The UNDG develops policies and procedures that allow member agencies to work together and analyse country issues, plan support strategies, implement support programmes, monitor results and advocate for change.

=== Resident coordinator system ===
The Resident Coordinator (RC) system coordinates all organizations of the United Nations system dealing with operational activities for development in the field. The RC system aims to bring together the different UN agencies to improve the efficiency and effectiveness of operational activities at the country level. Resident Coordinators lead UN country teams in more than 130 countries and are the designated representatives of the Secretary-General for development operations. Working closely with national governments, Resident Coordinators and country teams to advocate the interests and mandates of the UN drawing on the support and guidance of the entire UN family. It is now coordinated by the UNSDG, chaired by the Deputy Secretary-General of the United Nations.

== Innovation Facility ==
The UNDP established the Innovation Facility in 2014, with support from the Government of Denmark, as a dedicated funding mechanism to nurture promising development interventions.

The Innovation Facility offers technical assistance and seed funding to collaborators across 170 countries and territories to explore new approaches to complex development challenges. Since its inception, the Innovation Facility has fostered innovation labs across all five regions to better deliver and monitor the SDGs. In 2015, the Innovation Facility invested in 62 initiatives across 45 countries to achieve 16 SDGs.

== Controversies ==
=== NSA surveillance ===
Documents of Edward Snowden showed in December 2013 that British and American intelligence agencies surveillance targets with the United States National Security Agency (NSA) included organisations such as the United Nations Development Programme, the UN's children's charity UNICEF and Médecins Sans Frontières and the Economic Community of West African States (ECOWAS).

=== Allegations of UNDP resources used by Hamas ===
In August 2016, Israel's Shin Bet security agency publicized the arrest of Wahid Abdallah al Bursh, a Palestinian engineer employed by the UNDP, stating he had confessed to being recruited in 2014 to help Hamas, the dominant Islamist group in Gaza. Among "various assignments" Bursh performed on behalf of Hamas was "using UNDP resources" to build a maritime jetty for its fighters; no further details were provided on this claim. Shin Bet also claimed Bursh had persuaded his UNDP superiors to prioritize neighbourhoods with Hamas operatives when earmarking reconstruction funds for Gaza, which was devastated by the 2014 war with Israel.

=== Alleged financial irregularities ===
The UNDP had been criticised by members of its staff and the Bush administration of the United States for irregularities in its finances in North Korea. Artjon Shkurtaj claimed that he had found counterfeit US dollars in the programmes' safe despite staff being paid in euros. The UNDP denied keeping improper accounts and any other wrongdoing.

=== Disarmament and controversy ===
In mid-2006, as first reported by Inner City Press and then by New Vision, UNDP halted its disarmament programmes in the Karamoja region of Uganda in response to human rights abuses in the parallel forcible disarmament programmes carried out by the Uganda People's Defence Force.

=== Russia UNDP GEF Project Corruption Scandal ===
In 2019, reports alleging possible misappropriation of funds for UNDP projects in Russia began to appear in the mainstream media. An article called "Greed and Graft at U.N. Climate Program" in August 2019 in Foreign Policy reported the findings of a 2017 final evaluation that a UNDP Global Environment Facility greenhouse gas reduction project, the UNDP GEF Energy Efficiency Standards and Labels project in Russia with a budget of US$7.8 million, did not meet its goals and had "strong indicators of deliberate misappropriation" of funds. The Foreign Policy article reported that concerns raised by whistleblowers Dmitry Ershov and John O'Brien and multiple other consultants to the project over many years about irregularities in the programme — which were first reported internally as far back in 2011— were largely dismissed or ignored for several years by their superiors in Istanbul, New York, and Washington, as well as by donor governments, including the United States. The Foreign Policy article reported that a 2017 confidential audit appendix prepared by final evaluators found "strong indicators of deliberate misappropriation" of millions of dollars in funds from the project between 2010 and 2014.

This led in March 2020 to 12 donor governments writing a letter to UNDP Administrator Achim Steiner demanding from UNDP an independent review of UNDP's handling of the energy efficiency standards and labels project in Russia, as reported again in Foreign Policy magazine in December 2020 where it was revealed that these donors had blasted UNDP for resisting appeals to fight corruption and further reports by the Financial Times about the 'systemic nature' of the problems and also reports by various other media outlets such as Climate Change News, Passblue and in Newsroom in the New Zealand media. In January 2021, this independent report into the matter as requested by the donors was published, 'Systems and Silos'. This independent review found "irregularities" and concluded the project in question was not managed "either efficiently or effectively" by UNDP and that a number of individuals were able to 'game the relatively weak systems of governance and technical capacity.' It suggested UNDP consider returning to the Global Environment Facility (which funded the project) its "entire management fee" as "restitution" and proposed "ongoing efforts to achieve changes in the work culture that reward greater transparency and remove fears of unfair reprisals" aimed at whistleblowers. Concerns over UNDP's failure to handle the Russia controversy in a satisfactory manner led to the government of the Netherlands freezing some 10 million euros in payments from November 2020, a decision reported in January 2021; the Dutch ministry responsible said the freeze was meant to signal dissatisfaction at the slow progress of the investigation in Russia.

In February 2022, the leaders of three leading NGOs in the fight against corruption, Transparency International, the Whistleblower International Network or WIN, and the Government Accountability Project wrote a public letter to UNDP's administrator Achim Steiner, expressing their serious concerns about the lack of whistleblower protection for John O'Brien and Dmitry Ershov by UNDP and highlighting the conclusion of the independent review on the failure by UNDP to carry out John O'Brien's whistleblower case in a satisfactory manner. According to the 2019 Foreign Policy article, Ershov claimed he was "pushed out of his U.N. job" after raising concerns about procurement irregularities and project conflicts of interest way back at the end of 2014.

In June 2022, BBC Two broadcast a 90-minute documentary, The Whistleblowers: Inside the UN, which reported on whistleblower cases across the UN system, including John O'Brien's case. It reported that O'Brien was fired from UNDP in March 2022 several days after his BBC interview. The documentary was described by The Guardian as exposing "a toxic culture" where senior UN leaders hide "behind a cloak of saintliness."

=== Iraq UNDP Funding Facility for Stabilisation Corruption Scandal ===
On 22 January 2024, the Guardian Newspaper reported that the US$1.88 billion funding facility for stabilization was riddled with corruption. The Guardian discovered that there had been some 136 corruption allegation cases to its Office of Audit and Investigations (OAI) in relation to the reconstruction programme – the majority of which were against suppliers rather than employees. Then on 5 February 2024, the Guardian Newspaper reported that UNDP had commissioned an internal management review of the Iraq corruption problems. It also reported that several donors had requested an independent review which exactly is what happened in the case of the UNDP GEF Russia corruption scandal.

The Guardian articles clearly show that the corruption problems at UNDP and the failure to protect whistleblowers remain, and have not been fixed. The Guardian Newspaper article reveals very similar themes of widespread kickbacks and corruption, staff who are scared to report wrongdoing, and almost no protection for whistleblowers who are scared to come forward in case they are retaliated against and/or lose their jobs.

== Administrator ==
The UNDP Administrator has the rank of an Under-Secretary-General of the United Nations. While the Administrator is often referred to as the third highest-ranking official in the UN (after the Secretary-General and Deputy Secretary-General), this has never been formally codified.

In addition to his/her responsibilities as head of UNDP, the Administrator is also the vice-chair of the UN Sustainable Development Group.

The position of Administrator is appointed by the Secretary-General of the UN and confirmed by the General Assembly for a term of four years.

As of December 2025, the UNDP Administrator is Alexander De Croo of Belgium, appointed to a four-year term on 17 November 2025. He succeeded Achim Steiner, who served from 2017 until June 2025, when his second term ended; Haoliang Xu, the Associate Administrator, served as acting Administrator in the interim. The Executive Board is chaired by a rotating state representative, its president, and the Administrator takes part in its meetings but has no voting powers.

The first administrator of the UNDP was Paul G. Hoffman, former head of the Economic Cooperation Administration which administered the Marshall Plan.

Other holders of the position have included: Bradford Morse, a former Republican congressman from the U.S. state of Massachusetts; William Draper, an American venture capitalist and friend of George H. W. Bush who saw one of the UN system's major achievements, the Human Development Report, introduced during his tenure; Mark Malloch Brown of the UK, who was previously Vice President of External Affairs at the World Bank and subsequently became UN Deputy Secretary-General; and Kemal Derviş, a former finance minister of Turkey and senior World Bank official.

Nr	Administrator	Nationality	Term
10	Alexander De Croo	Belgium	2025–Incumbent
9	Achim Steiner	Brazil / Germany	2017–2025
8	Helen Clark	New Zealand	2009–2017
7	Kemal Derviş	Turkey	2005–2009
6	Mark Malloch Brown	United Kingdom	1999–2005
5	James Gustave Speth	United States	1993–1999
4	William Henry Draper	United States	1986–1993
3	F. Bradford Morse	United States	1976–1986
2	Rudolph A. Peterson	United States	1972–1976
1	Paul G. Hoffman	United States	1966–1972

=== Associate Administrator ===
The Associate Administrator represents UNDP in the United Nations Sustainable Development Group and in related inter-agency and UN development system reform processes, as delegated by the Administrator. The position has been held by Holiang Xu (China) since June 2023. He replaced Usha Rao-Monari (India).

=== Assistant administrators ===
Assistant Administrators of the UNDP, Assistant Secretaries-General and Directors of the Regional Bureaus are:

- Abdallah Al Dardari (Syria), Head of Regional Bureau for Arab States
- Ahunna Eziakonwa (Nigeria) Head of Regional Bureau for Africa
- Kanni Wignaraja (Sri Lanka) Head of Regional Bureau for Asia and Pacific
- Ivana Živković (Croatia) Head of Regional Bureau for Europe and the CIS
- Michelle Muschett (Panama), Head of Regional Bureau for Latin America and the Caribbean
- Angelique M. Crumbly, Head of Bureau for Management Services
- Susan Brown (Switzerland), Head of Bureau for External Relations and Advocacy
- Shoko Noda (Japan), Director of Crisis Bureau

== See also ==
- Development aid
- Economic development
- Equator Prize
- Human development
- International Covenant on Economic, Social and Cultural Rights
- International development
- International Development Association
- List of HIV-positive people
- List of UNDP country codes
- Match Against Poverty
- PassBlue
- Special Programme on Human Reproduction
- UNDP Goodwill Ambassador
- United Nations Economic and Social Council (ECOSOC)
- United Nations Millennium Campaign
- United Nations Sustainable Development Group
- United Nations Volunteers
- U.S. Committee for the United Nations Development Program
- World Population Day
- Group of 77
