= Ilay Cooper =

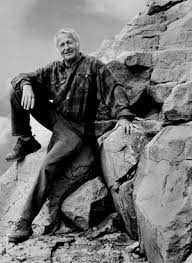
- Born: 10 March 1943 (age 83); Swanage, Dorset
- Education: University of London
- Occupations: Art historian, author, photographer
- Relatives: Mary Welman, Gilbert "Gibby" Molesworth Welman
- Writing career
- Years active: 1970–2025
- Subject: South Asian Art
- Notable works: Purbeck Revealed (2004), The Square and Compass (2007), Arts and Crafts of India (1996), The Guide to Painted Towns of Shekhawati (1987)
- Website: www.ilaycooper.com

Ilay Cooper (born 10 March 1943) is a British art historian, author, and photographer known for his research on South Asian mural art, particularly in Rajasthan (India) and Lahore (Pakistan), as well as for his work on the heritage of Dorset, England. He has also donated artworks to the British Museum. His work has been recognized by the Indian Government many times.

== Early life and education ==
Cooper was born on 10 March 1943 and raised in Purbeck, Dorset, England. He studied geology and zoology at the University of London. After graduation, he returned to Purbeck but began extensive travels in South Asia, developing a lifelong interest in Indian and Pakistani mural art.

== Career ==
=== South Asian research ===
Cooper spent more than fifteen years in India and Pakistan, documenting wall paintings and murals in lesser-studied regions. He conducted extensive surveys of the painted havelis of Shekhawati, Rajasthan, documenting over 2,200 buildings between 1985 and 1987.

He also researched Mughal murals in Lahore, Pakistan, supported in part by scholarships such as the Charles Wallace Trust. His publications and photographic archives contribute to the understanding of Mughal-era and regional wall paintings.

=== Dorset and Purbeck ===
Cooper has written several books and articles about Purbeck, Dorset, including studies of local architecture, landscape, and cultural heritage. He has documented the geology of the region, including its historic quarries and building stones.

== Publications ==
=== Books ===
- The Painted Towns of Shekhawati. New Delhi: Prakash Books, various editions. ISBN 978-8172341718
- Rajasthan: Exploring Painted Shekhawati. New Delhi: Niyogi Books, 2014. ISBN 978-93-83098-21-7
- Purbeck Revealed. James Pembroke Publishing, 2004; 2nd edition, 2008
- The Square & Compass, 2007
- Purbeck Arcadia: Dunshay Manor & the Spencer Watsons, 2015

=== Academic papers ===
- “The Painted Walls of Churu, Jhunjhunu and Sikar Districts of Rajasthan,” Vol II, 1986
- “Man Singh to Maonda: Murals of North-East Rajasthan,” Vol VIII, 1992
- “Sikhs, Saints and Shadows of Angels: some Mughal Murals in Buildings along the North Wall of Lahore Fort,” Vol IX, 1993

== Legacy and impact ==
Cooper’s work has been cited in both academic and cultural contexts as an important documentation of mural art in South Asia. Reviews of his books acknowledge the comprehensiveness of his surveys and the importance of his photographic archives. He is recognized for linking his research in South Asia with local heritage preservation in Dorset.
