= Center for Sustainable Global Enterprise =

Center of applied research, learning, and practice at Cornell University

The Center for Sustainable Global Enterprise (CSGE) is a center of applied research, learning and practice in the Samuel Curtis Johnson Graduate School of Management (Johnson) at Cornell University.

== History ==
In 2002 the late Samuel C. Johnson endowed the SC Johnson Professorship in Sustainable Global Enterprise. He stipulated that the Professorships’ role be to enhance students' understanding of global sustainability and prepare them for management of equitable, as well as economically and environmentally sustainable enterprises. Stuart Hart assumed the SC Johnson Professorship in 2003. A second gift provided an initial endowment and operating funds to establish the Center for Sustainable Global Enterprise in 2004 with Stuart Hart as its Founding Director. Mark Milstein became the full-time Director of the Center in 2006, with Dr. Hart continuing as the Samuel C. Johnson Professor in Sustainable Global Enterprise.

== Approach ==
The Center frames global sustainability challenges as business opportunities, and works with firms to specify innovative, entrepreneurial, and new business alternatives they can implement in the marketplace. Its programs include those focused on market and enterprise creation (particularly in low income communities), clean technology innovation and sustainable finance.

Applied Research
The Center is active in researching new approaches to business model creation, generating applied research geared toward the development of new managerial skills and identifying revolutionary processes and techniques for the commercialization of next-generation, clean technologies and business-led solutions to global poverty. The Center’s faculty and researchers look to publish their findings in peer-reviewed journals, books and practitioner-oriented articles.
Partnerships
The Center’s programs and activities serve a variety of partners, including companies, NGOs, multilateral organizations, government entities, entrepreneurs, students and alumni. Companies and organizations such as General Electric, IBM, International Finance Corporation, Pfizer and Shell Hydrogen have partnered with the Center to sponsor projects conducted by teams of students under the guidance of faculty.
Performance Learning
The Center follows Johnson’s learning style that requires students to perform (deliver results) in a real business setting. This approach integrates three elements: students (1) learn theoretical frameworks, and (2) apply them to real-world situations, while (3) receiving continuous feedback from experts. Johnson’s flagship performance learning experience is its semester-long immersion program.

Sustainable Global Enterprise (SGE) Immersion - Founded in 2006, the Sustainable Global Enterprise Immersion is one of the six immersion programs offered at Johnson where students pick an area of specialization. The SGE Immersion has been designed to allow for maximum flexibility, while maintaining a rigorous program. It consists of 3 overlapping and interconnected phases:

- Sustainable Enterprise Boot Camp - Students spend 8 hours a day for 6 days before the semester begins reading, discussing and analyzing the nature of social and environmental sustainability and the prospects for sustainable enterprise. This week ends with an introduction to student projects that will be completed throughout the semester.
- Sustainable Global Enterprise - A 1/2 semester course that dives into cases and in-depth research highlighting the past successes and failures of sustainable enterprise.
- Sustainable Global Enterprise Practicum Projects - By participating in company-sponsored projects secured through the Center, students develop the critical thinking and analytical skills necessary to take on leadership roles in business, regardless of industry or functional area. Past projects include work with GE, Dupont, Dow Corning, the Environmental Credit Corporation, WaterHealth International and Plebys International.

== People ==
The Center is Directed by Dr. Mark Milstein, and Dr. Stuart Hart maintains the S.C. Johnson Chair of Sustainable Global Enterprise.
