= The Whistleblowers: Inside the UN =

The Whistleblowers: Inside the UN is a BBC Two documentary film from July 2022. It alleges widespread corruption, chauvinism, misogyny and harassment within the United Nations.

== See also ==
- Criticism of the United Nations
- Quis custodiet ipsos custodes?
