= M. S. Krishnan (professor) =

M. S. Krishnan is the Michael R. and Mary Kay Hallman Fellow & Professor of Business Information Technology; Chair of Business Information Technology at the University of Michigan's Ross School of Business.

== Education ==
He obtained his Ph.D. from Carnegie Mellon University in 1996, with his Doctoral thesis on Cost and Quality Considerations in Software Product Management. Prior to this, he had completed his M.S. from Carnegie Mellon University (1993), M.C.A. from the University of Delhi (1987) and B.Sc. from the University of Delhi (1984).

== Career ==
He began his career as a lecturer at the University of Michigan in 1996, becoming an assistant professor in 1997, an associate professor in 2000 and a full professor in 2004. At Michigan, he is currently the co-director of the Center for Global Resource Leverage: India.

His research articles have appeared in various journals, including IEEE Transactions on Software Engineering and Harvard Business Review. He has published about 40 peer-reviewed articles. He also serves on the boards of many academic journals and is Associate Editor of Management Science and Information Systems Research. He just finished a book with Professor C.K. Prahalad entitled The New Age of Innovation on global resource leverage. He serves as an adviser to Next Services and Marketics.

In January 2000, the American Society for Quality (ASQ) selected him as one of the 21 voices of quality for the twenty-first century. In 2004, Optimize Magazine named him one of the four power thinkers on Business Technology.
