= Michael J. Gelb =

American writer and speaker (1952-)

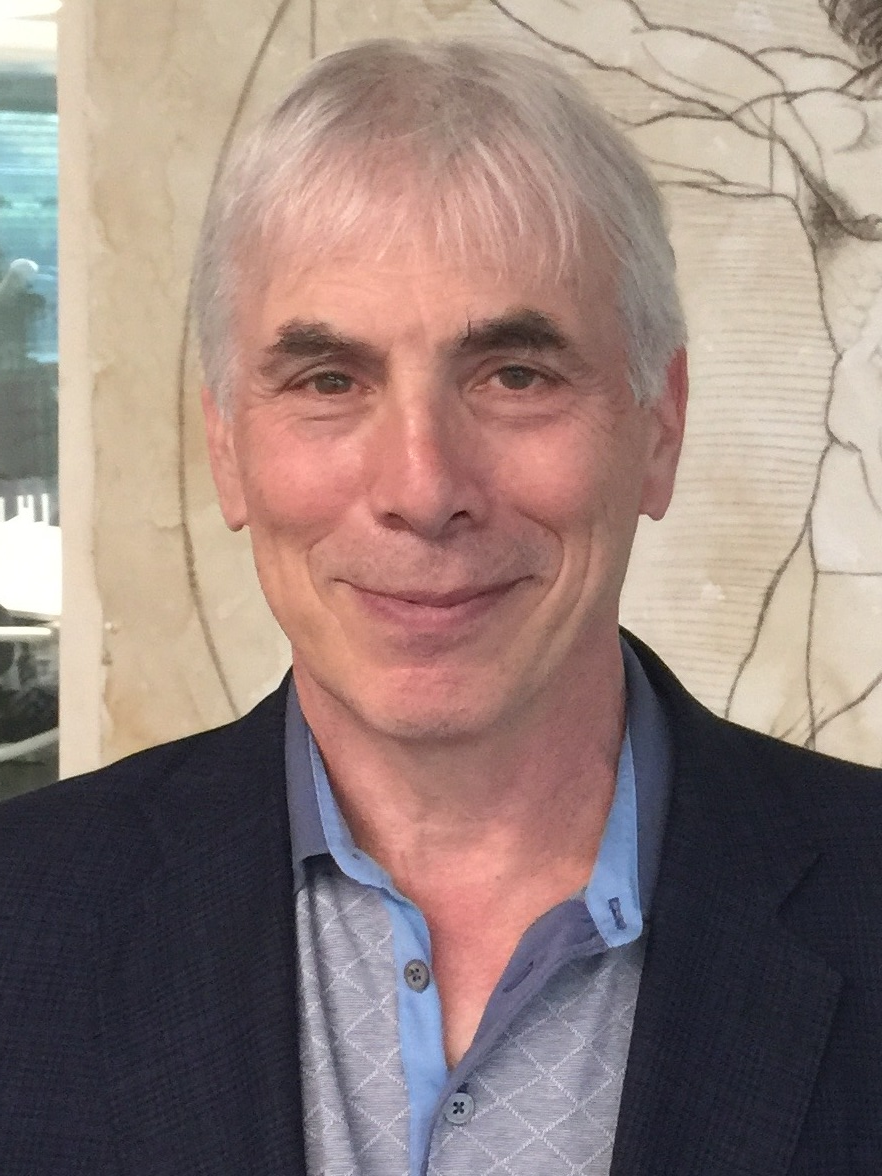
- Gelb in 2017
- Born: 1952 (age 73–74); New Jersey
- Education: Clark University: B.A., Goddard College: M.A
- Occupations: Author (non-fiction), Executive Coach, Management Consultant
- Notable work: "How to Think Like Leonardo da Vinci: Seven Steps to Genius Every Day"
- Website: michaelgelb.com

Michael J. Gelb (born 1952) is an American non-fiction author, executive coach and management consultant. He is a senior fellow at the Center for Humanistic Management and member of the advisory board for Leading People and Organizations at the Fordham University Gabelli School of Business. He is also a Batten Institute Research Fellow at the University of Virginia Darden Graduate School of Business.

== Early life and education ==
Gelb grew up in Passaic, New Jersey. He received a Bachelor of Arts in Psychology and Philosophy from Clark University in 1973, and a master's degree in Psychophysical Re-education from Goddard College in 1978. In 1978 he also was certified as a teacher of the F. M. Alexander Technique of Mind/Body coordination.

== Career ==
Gelb founded High Performance Learning, a training, coaching and consulting firm, in 1982. He has been active with the Conscious Capitalism movement since its inception and co-authored The Healing Organization: Awakening the Conscience of Business to Help Save the World (2019), with Conscious Capitalism co-founder Raj Sisodia.

== Bibliography ==
- Mastering the Art of Public Speaking: 8 Secrets to Transform Fear and Supercharge Your Career, New World Library, September 8, 2020.
- The Healing Organization: Awakening the Conscience of Business to Help Save the World (2019), (with Rajendra Sisodia), HarperCollins Leadership, September 17, 2019.
- The Art of Connection: 7 Relationship-Building Skills Every Leader Needs Now, New World Library, 2017.
- Creativity On Demand: How to Ignite and Sustain the Fire of Genius, Sounds True, 2014.
- Brain Power: Improve Your Mind As You Age (with Kelly Howell), New World Library, 2012.
- Wine Drinking For Inspired Thinking: Uncork Your Creative Juices. Running Press, 2010.
- Innovate Like Edison: The Success System of America's Greatest Inventor (with Sarah Miller Caldicott). Plume, 2008.
- The How to Think Like Leonardo da Vinci Workbook: Your Personal Companion to How to Think Like Leonardo da Vinci, Dell Publishing, June 15, 1999.
- How to Think like Leonardo Da Vinci: Seven Steps to Genius Everyday Delacorte Press, 1998.
- Work Like da Vinci: Gaining the Creative Advantage in Your Business and Career (audio book), Gildan Media, 2006.
- Da Vinci Decoded: Discovering the Spiritual Secrets of Leonardo's Seven Principles, Delacorte Press, September 28, 2004.
- Discover Your Genius: How to Think Like History's Ten Most Revolutionary Minds, Harper Perennial, January 21, 2003.
- More Balls Than Hands: Juggling Your Way to Success by Learning to Love Your Mistakes, Prentice Hall Press, August 26, 2003.
- Lessons from the Art of Juggling: How to Achieve Your Full Potential in Business, Learning and Life, (with Tony Buzan), Harmony Books, 1994.
- Thinking for Change: Discovering the Power to Create, Communicate and Lead, Harmony Books, January 1, 1996.
- Present Yourself!: Capture Your Audience with Great Presentation Skills, Jalmar Press, December 1, 1988.
- SAMURAI CHESS: Mastering Strategic Thinking through the Martial Art of the Mind, (with Grandmaster Raymond Keene). Aurum Press, January 1, 1997.
- Body Learning: An Introduction to the Alexander Technique, Henry Holt and Company, 1981.
