= Haoliang Xu =

United Nations Official

Xu Haoliang
- 徐浩良
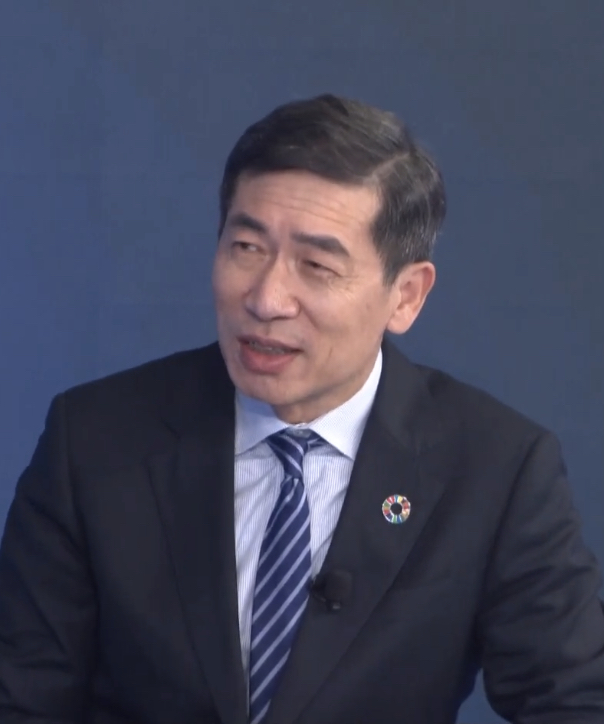

Associate Administrator of the United Nations Development Programme
- Incumbent
- Assumed office June 26, 2023
- Appointed by: António Guterres
- Preceded by: Usha Rao-Monari

United Nations Under-Secretary-General
- Incumbent
- Assumed office June 26, 2023
- Appointed by: António Guterres
- Preceded by: Usha Rao-Monari

Director of the Bureau for Policy and Programme Support of the United Nations Development Programme
- Incumbent
- Assumed office July 3, 2019
- Appointed by: António Guterres
- Preceded by: Pedro Conceição

Personal details
- Born: 1961 (age 64–65) Shanghai, China
- Education: Tongji University; Stevens Institute of Technology; Columbia University

Xu Haoliang (Chinese: 徐浩良; born 1961) is a Chinese diplomat serving as the United Nations (UN) Under-Secretary-General since 2023, Associate Administrator of the United Nations Development Programme (UNDP) since 2023, and Director of the Bureau for Policy and Programme Support of UNDP in New York since 2019.

== Education ==
Xu, a Chinese national, holds a Bachelor in Bridge Engineering from Tongji University, and a Master's degree in Management Science in Management from the Stevens Institute of Technology, United States. He also holds a Masters’ of International Affairs in Economic Development and Policy Analysis from Columbia University.

== Career ==
Mr. Xu served as UN Assistant Secretary-General and UNDP Director of the Regional Bureau for Asia and the Pacific. Appointed on 13 August 2013, Mr. Xu led UNDP support to the country and regional sustainable development programs in 36 countries in Asia and Pacific. His tenure has been focused on reinventing UNDP's 24 Country Offices in Asia-Pacific, the Regional Hub in Bangkok, and Headquarters in New York.

Previously, Xu was Deputy Director of the Regional Bureau for Europe and the Commonwealth of Independent States at UNDP. Prior to that, he held senior UNDP positions in Kazakhstan, Pakistan, Timor-Leste, and Iran. Before joining the UN, Xu was a computer-aided design engineer with Louis Berger Group in Morristown, New Jersey, United States, and an assistant lecturer at Tongji University in Shanghai, China.

Xu has appeared on the Washington Post, BBC World TV, CNBC, the Wall Street Journal and other top-tier media. He delivered policy speeches at Harvard, Georgetown, Johns Hopkins, Columbia and other universities. He was featured by the EY and The Guardian in the 2014 Global Public Leaders Series.
