= WaterHealth International =

Coordinates: 33°38′1″N 117°43′56″W

- Type: Private
- Industry: Water
- Headquarters: Irvine, California, U.S.
- Area served: India, Nigeria, Ghana
- Key people: Hank Habicht (Chairman); Sanjay Bhatnagar (CEO); G V L Narasimha Rao (COO)
- Products: dr. water
- Subsidiaries: WaterHealth India, WaterHealth Ghana, WaterHealth Nigeria
- Website: www.waterhealth.com

WaterHealth International is a private, American multinational corporation headquartered in Irvine, California. The company operates as a social business that provides drinking water to communities in primarily rural areas. WaterHealth purifies and retails water through decentralized plants termed "WaterHealth Center," which serve an average consumer base of 10000. The company has installed around 500 WaterHealth Centers primarily in India, but also in Bangladesh, Ghana, Nigeria, and Liberia. Daily output of purified water across all of the WaterHealth Centers falls around 1.4 million liters.

The company was founded in 1995 as a market development firm that operated primarily in Mexico and the Philippines. By 2002 and 2003, however, the company reoriented its focus to water retailing services and began to center more heavily in Asia and Africa. The company currently operates through wholly owned subsidiaries like WaterHealth India and WaterHealth Ghana.

== History ==
WaterHealth was founded in 1995. The company began its operations when it won the bid to use a new Ultraviolet (UV) disinfectant technology invented by Ashok Gadgil, a researcher at the University of California, Berkeley who later became the Chief Technology Officer of WaterHealth International.

Shortly after 1995, WaterHealth established UV Waterworks Plants in Mexico and the Philippines. After limited success in those areas, Tralance Addy, the CEO appointed to the company in 2002, shifted the company’s focus to water distribution and retailing in Asia and Africa.

In January 2014, WaterHealth launched its nonprofit arm, the Jaldhaara Foundation. According to officials at Jaldhaara, the foundation aims to provide purified drinking water and educate underserved people on its importance. Additionally, Jaldhaara hopes to teach women how to operate local WaterHealth centers.

== Controversies ==
In 2011, WaterHealth ex-CEO Sanjay Bhatnagar was criticized by Wenonah Hauter, a environmental organizer, for describing "how his investors were making piles of money selling water in villages in Africa and India." She called Bhatnagar "a vocal proponent of the poor paying for water."
