= Stuart L. Hart =

American academic

Academic background
- Education: University of Rochester; Yale School of Forestry & Environmental Studies; University of Michigan

Academic work
- Institutions: Cornell University; University of Vermont
- Doctoral students: Lynn Perry Wooten

Stuart L. Hart is an American academic, writer and theorist. A Fortune 100 consultant, Hart is one of the world's leading authorities on the implications of sustainable development and environmentalism relative to business strategy. His is the founder of Enterprise for a Sustainable World, a non-profit dedicated to helping businesses make the transition to sustainability.

== Education ==
Hart holds a B.A from University of Rochester, an M.F.S. from the Yale School of Forestry and Environmental Studies, and a Ph.D. from University of Michigan.

== Career ==
After graduating from UM, where he founded the Corporate Environmental Management Program, he took a position at the Kenan-Flagler Business School in the University of North Carolina, serving as Hans Zulliger Distinguished Professor of Sustainable Enterprise and Professor of Strategic Management. While there, he founded the Center for Sustainable Global Enterprise and the Base of the Pyramid Learning Laboratory.

Hart served as Cornell's SC Johnson Professor of Sustainable Global Enterprise until retiring in 2013.

In 2014, Hart joined the Grossman School of Business at the University of Vermont to create a new one-year Sustainable Entrepreneurship MBA.

== Publications ==
Hart has published over 50 papers and authored or edited five books. In 1997, he wrote the seminal article "Beyond Greening: Strategies for a Sustainable World" which helped launch the movement for corporate sustainability. The article won Harvard Business Review's Mckinsey Award for the best article of the year. With C.K.Prahalad, Prof. Hart also wrote the 2002 article "The Fortune at the Bottom of the Pyramid", later expanded into a book of the same name. He is author of the book Capitalism at the Crossroads: The Unlimited Business Opportunities in Solving the World's Most Difficult Problems as well as several scholarly articles and publications. According to Bloomberg Businessweek, he is "one of the founding fathers of the "base of the pyramid" economic theory".
