= Motor skill consolidation =

Aspect of learning of motor skills

Motor skill consolidation represents the process by which motor skills are transformed from an initial fragile state, in which they are especially prone to being disrupted or lost, to a more solid or permanent state. Any newly formed motor skill, such as learning to play a musical instrument or adjusting one's running stride, is subject to a consolidation period. The time course of this period during which new motor skills are susceptible to disruption appears to be on the order of a few hours.

== Distinctions between procedural and declarative memories ==
Motor skills, also known as procedural memories, are distinct from declarative memories, which involve memories of events, people, places, etc. Both types of memories are, however, subject to a consolidation period, though the neural mechanisms appear to differ. Some of the earliest evidence pointing to a distinction between procedural and declarative memories came from the famous neurology patient HM. As a treatment for severe epilepsy, portions of HM's temporal lobes, including both hippocampi, were removed. This left him unable to form new declarative memories (anterograde amnesia), while his ability to learn novel motor tasks remained intact.

== Motor skills and the internal model ==
It is believed that motor skill acquisition requires learning a new internal model of limb dynamics. For instance, in order to reach for a cup of coffee, a person must have an implicit understanding of the mass of their own arm, and how specific patterns of muscle activation will change the position of that limb. A common model for studying motor learning and consolidation involves perturbations to reaching tasks using robotic arms to impart forces on the limb during reaches, forcing the subject to learn new internal representations of the limb to take these new external forces into account.

== Role of sleep in motor memory consolidation ==
A number of recent studies have begun to demonstrate the importance of sleep in the process of consolidation of both procedural and declarative memories. For instance, it was recently shown that even a short 90-minute nap after training in a skilled finger task prevented interference two hours after the task when compared to subjects that did not nap. During night sleep, REM sleep and slow-wave sleep both contribute to the motor memory consolidation process through an increase in neuromodulatory activity, and regular field potential oscillations such as sleep spindles (reviewed by Diekelmann and Born, 2010).

== Pathologies and processes affecting motor memory consolidation ==
While the precise neural basis for motor skill consolidation is not fully understood, many of the structures necessary for the process have been identified. As the process of learning a motor skill requires both initial execution of the skill, and long storage of the consolidated memory, a complex network of brain areas are involved, including the primary motor cortex, the cerebellum, the prefrontal cortex, and the basal ganglia. Given that motor skill consolidation is a distributed process, the ability to form new procedural memories is susceptible to the effects of a number of processes and pathologies.

=== Cerebellar diseases ===
The cerebellum, and especially the cerebellar cortex, is critical for coordinating motor outputs during skilled tasks, as well as the process of stabilizing newly formed motor skills. Damage to the cerebellum can occur through a number of causes including trauma, alcoholism, chronic degenerative diseases such as olivopontocerebellar atrophy, and genetic developmental disorders.

=== Parkinson's disease ===
Parkinson's disease, which affects the basal ganglia, has been shown to cause an impairment in the ability to consolidate new motor skills. For instance, when Parkinsonian patients were tested in force field reaching tasks, they showed significantly less retention of the motor skill than controls during later testing. This points to the importance of the basal ganglia, the primary target of Parkinson's disease, in creating the new sensory/motor mappings that are necessary for the long term retention of a motor skill.

=== Stroke ===
A stroke is the damage of a volume of brain tissue resulting from restricted blood supply, which is often a result of occluded blood vessels leading to the brain. Given the large number of brain areas involved in the motor skill acquisition, strokes affecting any of these areas can lead to deficits in motor skill consolidation. Therapies for stroke have focused on modified practice techniques to allow the reacquisition of important skills after the damage has occurred.

=== Aging ===
Aging has been shown to have an effect on declarative memory consolidation, which appears to be related to disruptions of sleep patterns, as well as hippocampal degeneration. However, aging does not appear to have a direct effect on motor skill consolidation, with subjects up to 95 years of age showing the ability to retain newly formed motor skills up to two years after acquisition.
