= The New Age of Innovation =

2008 book by C. K. Prahalad and M. S. Krishnan

- Author: C. K. Prahalad; M. S. Krishnan
- Language: English
- Genre: Non-fiction
- Publication date: April 2008
- ISBN: 978-0-071-59828-6

The New Age of Innovation: Driving Cocreated Value Through Global Networks (ISBN 9780071598286) is a book by University of Michigan Ross School of Business professors C. K. Prahalad and M. S. Krishnan. The book was published in April 2008.

== Book summary ==
In the first chapter, Prahalad and Krishnan outline their central thesis; that there are new managerial demands in business, requiring new sources of value creation. They argue that these demands have created an N=1 and R=G environment, where companies need to customize their product for each customer by gaining access to a new array of suppliers.

The book argues that the old sources of competitive advantage – technology, labor, and capital – are fading and that new sources are emerging. Prahalad and Krishnan suggest an internal capacity to reconfigure resources in real time by focusing on clearly documented, transparent, and resilient business processes (the link between strategy, business models and operations) has become a strong differentiator. They also argue that a focus on co-creation, by developing an R=G supply network and emphasizing analytics which identify trends and unique opportunities can create a strong competitive advantage.

The last four chapters describe how to implement these new strategies. Recognizing that many companies have fragmented and archaic systems, the book describes typical problems that occur when migrating to an N=1 and R=G friendly system. Prahalad and Krishnan emphasize the importance of a social architecture with strong linkages between managers and the technical architecture. They also outline the necessity for companies to recruit new skills from around the world and use globalization to its advantage.

== Key concepts ==
The book argues that "the industrial system as we know it has been morphing for some time. Now it may have reached an inflection point."

=== N=1 ===
N=1 requires companies to focus on the importance of individual customer experiences and tailor their product accordingly. They also emphasize the importance of strong analytics which allow management to discover trends and unique opportunities and enable the company to engage in product co-creation with their consumer base.

=== R=G ===
R=G advises firms take a horizontal approach to supply rather than vertical integration. The focus is on obtaining access, rather than ownership, to resources from an array of suppliers both inside and outside the firm. R=G provides the best opportunity for firms to leverage the necessary resources to co-create a personalized experience for each customer. R=G is often mistaken as a suggestion to outsource, however this is often not the case, as there are many notable instances where it makes sense for companies to leverage local resources to fulfill a personalized demand model.

== See also ==
- Open Innovation
