= C. K. Prahalad =

Indian-American Strategist, educator and author

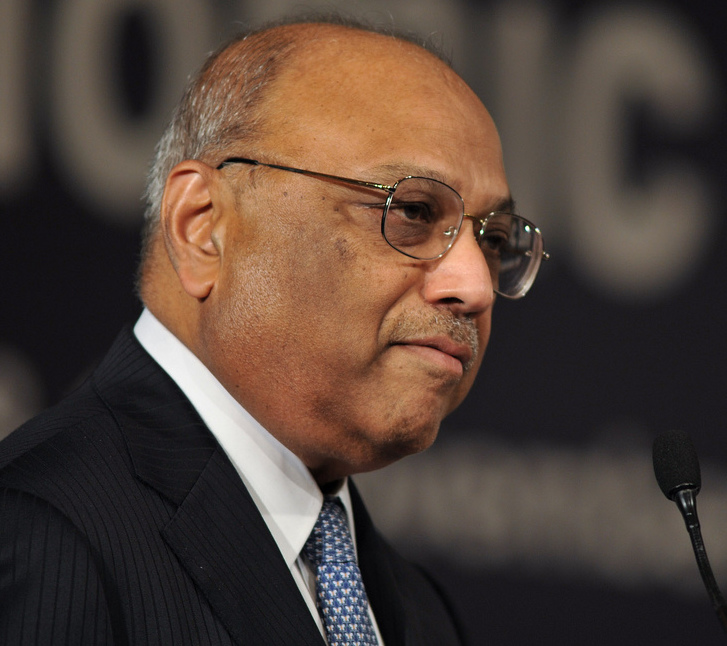
- Prahalad at World Economic Forum's India Economic Summit in 2009
- Born: 8 August 1941; Coimbatore, Madras Presidency, British India (now in Tamil Nadu, India)
- Died: 16 April 2010 (aged 68); San Diego, California, U.S.
- Education: Loyola College, Chennai; IIM Ahmedabad; Harvard Business School
- Occupation: Professor
- Spouse: Gayatri
- Children: 2

Coimbatore Krishnarao Prahalad (8 August 1941 – 16 April 2010) was an Indian-American entrepreneur and author.

== Education and teaching ==
Prahalad was born in Kannada-speaking (Note: Although Amrita Vishwa Vidyapeetham states his mother tongue to be Tamil, there is some bias in the source as the college is based in Coimbatore (in Tamil Nadu).) Madhwa brahmin family at Coimbatore (Tamil Nadu) in 1941. His father was a Sanskrit scholar and judge in Madras (now Chennai).

At 19, he had finished his BSc degree in physics from Loyola College, Chennai, part of the University of Madras, and joined Union Carbide, where he worked for four years. Four years later in 1964 he enrolled for the pioneer batch of Postgraduate Programme in Business Administration at the Indian Institute of Management Ahmedabad and graduated in 1966.

At Harvard Business School, Prahalad wrote a doctoral thesis on multinational management in two and a half years, graduating with a DBA degree in 1975. After graduating from Harvard, Prahalad returned to the Indian Institute of Management Ahmedabad to serve as professor before returning to US again in 1977.

He returned to the United States in 1977, with an appointment to the University of Michigan's Ross School of Business Administration. He eventually became a tenured full professor, earning the university's highest distinction, Distinguished University Professor, in 2005.

== Career ==
In early 1990 Prahalad advised Philips' Jan Timmer on the restructuring of this electronics corporation, then on the brink of collapse. A process which was named Operation Centurion was set up, and was successful after two or three years. He was the Paul and Ruth McCracken Distinguished University Professor of Corporate Strategy at the University of Michigan Stephen M. Ross School of Business.

Prahalad was the inspiration behind the vision of India@75. While commemorating the 60th year of India’s independence, on 23 September 2007, during the Incredible India@60 celebration at New York, he articulated the idea of holistic three dimensional development of India to acquire enough economic strength, technological vitality, and moral leadership by 2022 – the 75th year of India's independence. The Confederation of Indian Industry adopted his vision on 8 May 2008. This initiative of CII has also found resonance with the Government, as in the ‘Strategy for New India@75’ document released by the NITI Aayog, Government of India in 2018. C. K. Prahalad is the co-author of a number of works in corporate strategy, including The Core Competence of the Corporation (with Gary Hamel, Harvard Business Review, May–June 1990) which as of 2010 was one of the most frequently reprinted articles published by the journal. He authored or co-authored: Competing for the Future (with Gary Hamel, 1994), The Future of Competition (with Venkat Ramaswamy, 2004), and The Fortune at the Bottom of the Pyramid: Eradicating Poverty through Profits (Wharton School Publishing, 2004). His last book, co-authored by M. S. Krishnan and published in April 2008, is The New Age of Innovation. He co-authored Innovation's Holy Grail with R.A Mashelkar, which was chosen as a Harvard Business Review Top 10 articles on Innovation and focuses on how developing nations are leading the way in innovation that focuses more on affordability and sustainability as opposed to the common premium pricing model.

Prahalad was co-founder and became chief executive officer of Praja Inc. ("Praja" from a Sanskrit word "Praja" which means "citizen" or "common people"). The company had goals of providing unrestricted access to information for people at the "bottom of the pyramid" and providing a test bed for various management ideas. It eventually laid off a third of its workforce, and was sold to TIBCO. In 2004 Prahalad co-founded management consultancy The Next Practice, to support companies in implementing the strategies outlined in The Fortune at the Bottom of the Pyramid, which continued in operation as of 2015. At the time of his death he was on the board of TiE, The Indus Entrepreneurs. Prahalad was a member of the Blue Ribbon Commission of the United Nations on Private Sector and Development.

=== Honors and awards ===
He was the first recipient of the Lal Bahadur Shastri Award for contributions to Management and Public Administration presented by the President of India in 1999.

- In 1994, he was presented the Maurice Holland Award from the Industrial Research Institute for an article published in Research-Technology Management titled "The Role of Core Competencies in the Corporation."
- In 2009, he was awarded Pravasi Bharatiya Samman.
- In 2009, he was named Padma Bhushan 'third in the hierarchy of civilian awards' by the Government of India.
- In 2009, he was named the world's most influential business thinker on the Thinkers50.com list.
- In 2009, he was awarded the Herbert Simon Award by the Rajk László College for Advanced Studies (Corvinus University of Budapest).
- In 2010, he was posthumously awarded the Viipuri International Prize in Strategic (Technology) Management and Business Economics by Lappeenranta University of Technology.
- In 2011, the Southern Regional Headquarters of Confederation of Indian Industry (CII) was named as Prof C K Prahalad Center
- In 2018, he was named the world's most influential business thinker on the Thinkers50.com list.

== Personal life ==
He was born to a stay at home mother and a father who was a judge. He is married to a woman named Gayatri, and shared two children with her - a son named Murali and a daughter named Deepa. Prahalad has three grandchildren.

On 16 April 2010, Prahalad died at the age of 68 of a previously undiagnosed lung illness in San Diego, California.

== Bibliography ==
"The Fortune at the Bottom of the Pyramid" is a book written by C.K. Prahalad and Stuart L. Hart, published in 2004. The primary argument of this book is that there is an untapped market that can be found in the worlds poorest populations.

Prahalad co-authored "Core Competence of the Corporation"(May 1990, Harvard Business Review) with Gary Hamel.

== Influence ==
C. K. Prahalad was ranked the number one business thinker by Thinkers 50 in 2007 and 2009. He was also initiated into their hall of fame, posthumously in 2018. Thinkers 50's "Breakthrough Idea Award" is in honor of Prahalad and named after him.

== See also ==
- Bottom of the pyramid
- Core competency
- Co-creation
- Dominant logic
