= Giovanni Battista Dagnino =

Italian economist, academic and educator

Giovanni Battista Dagnino is an Italian economist, academic, engaged speaker, and educator. He is the Chair of Management and Professor of Digital Strategy and Artificial Intelligence at the Libera Università Maria SS. Assunta University of Rome, where he is the Founder and Academic Director of LUMSA International Research Center for Artificial Intelligence Management. He is also Coordinator of the Interest Group on AI in Management of the Italian Society of Management (SIMA).

He has been the Founding Director of the MSc Degree in Economics and Management. As part of his leadership engagement, he is also the Director of the LUMSA EMBA-Executive Master of Business Adiministration and of the LUMSA-BIP Executive Course on Sustainability Management.

He is known for his foundational and influential work on coopetition strategy and for initiating and refining the study of temporary competitive advantage. He has published widely and is conducting a series of smart projects on digital transformation and digital mindset, AI strategy and big data analytics.

== Education ==
He graduated at Bocconi University of Milan and received his PhD in Business Economics and Management from the University of Catania and MURST-The Italian Ministry for University and Scientific and Technological Research. He has also studied Political Science and International Affairs at the University of Palermo.

He has held multiple visiting positions at Harvard Business School, Tuck School of Business at Dartmouth, Wharton School, London Business School, IESE Business School, Grenoble Ecole de Management, Macquarie Business School, Australia, the University of Mannheim, IAE Universidad Austral, Argentina and University of York, UK.

== Career ==
Since 2001, Dagnino has researched coopetition strategy, and, with Richard D'Aveni and Ken Smith, in 2010 has inaugurated the study of temporary competitive advantage as a consequence of hypercompetition. In addition, Dagnino is researching hubris-driven strategies and the relationships between strategy, entrepreneurship and governance. In this field, he received the "Best Paper Proceedings" Award by the Academy of Management for a study on corporate governance and international diversification.

Dagnino's research contributions revolve around the advancement of the strategic theory of the firm with specific focus on coopetition strategy dynamics, the relationships between strategy, entrepreneurship and governance, and the management of temporary advantages.

More recently, he has been carrying out various research projects and graduate and post-graduate teaching on digital transformation strategies, digital mindset, big data analytics, and AI strategy.

Dagnino's work has appeared in pioneering books such as "Coopetition Strategy: Theory Experiments and Cases", Routledge, 2009; "New Frontiers in Entrepreneurship. Recognizing, Seizing, and Executing Opportunities", Springer, 2010; "Coopetition: Winning Strategies for the 21st Century", Elgar, 2010; "Research Methods for Strategic Management", Routledge, 2016; "Entrepreneurial Ecosystems and the Diffusion of Startups", Elgar, 2018, "Foundations of Coopetition Strategy. A Framework for Competition and Cooperation", Routledge, 2021, and the recent trailblazing tome of Elgar Research Handbooks in Business and Management series The Research Handbook of Digital Strategy, Elgar 2023.

== Journal Leadership ==
He was Associate Editor of Long Range Planning and served on the editorial boards of Academy of Management Review, Strategic Management Journal, Long Range Planning, Journal of Management and Governance, International Journal of Strategic Business Alliances, International Studies of Management and Organization, American Journal of Business, Journal of Entrepreneurship, Business and Economics and Journal of Industrial and Business Economics, as well as in the scientific advisory board of Grenoble Ecole de Management.

Dagnino is Co-editor of the Journal of Management and Governance, Co-Director of LUMSA Executive MBA, member of LUMSA Master School Scientific Council and member of LUMSA Committee on Sustainability, and has been chair of the Scientific Committee of LUMSA Digital Hub

== Impact ==
Academic

Professor Dagnino's work and streams of seminal publications have been instrumental in establishing and landing two entirely new fields of study and practice in the management realm:

(1) coopetition strategy, a field of study/practice he contributed to set off over a decade ago; and

(2) the kickoff and extension of temporary advantage.

Web of Science - Ranked in the top 1% of published articles in the Business category (2010 – 2014) by the Web of Science for D'Aveni, Richard A.; Dagnino, Giovanni Battista; Smith, Ken G. (2010-12-01). "The age of temporary advantage". Strategic Management Journal. 31 (13): 1371–1385. doi:10.1002/smj.897. ISSN 0143-2095.

Article ranked 215 out of 27,946 articles in the Business category, based on the number of citations from 2010 to 2014 by the Web of Science

Strategic Management Journal (SMJ) - Ranked 4th in the most accessed articles list at SMJ over 2012-2016

Google Scholar – Four of his key publications on coopetition strategy have attracted over 2000 citations in Google Scholar

Wiley Publishing – Two consecutive times Wiley Top Cited Article 2020-2021 and 2021-2022 and Wiley Top Downloaded Article 2019-2020 for "Temporary Competitive Advantage: An Investigation into the Core of the Literature and Challenges for Future Research” - Dagnino, G.B., Picone, P.M., and Ferrigno, G. (2021). International Journal of Management Reviews. 23(1): 85-115.

Practice

Coopetition Strategy

Teaching. As a fallout of the stream of publications and the various initiative and activities conducted over time on the relevant issue and its ensuing international recognition, coopetition and coopetition strategy receive specific treatment in a range of standard undergraduate and graduate textbooks in strategic management, such as F.T. Rothaermel, Strategic Management. McGraw-Hill (3rd edn. 2016), and R.M. Grant, Contemporary Strategy Analysis. Wiley (11th edn. 2021).

Dictionaries. The term coopetition is shown today in many major English dictionaries such as Cambridge and Collins.

Temporary Advantage

Consulting. BCG Henderson Institute Podcast on Temporary and Sustainable Nature of Competitive Advantage (28/09/2022): https://bcghendersoninstitute.com/rita-mcgrath-and-roger-l-martin-on-the-nature-of-competitive-advantage/

Military. His pioneering publication on temporary competitive advantage in Strategic Management Journal (2010), has been cited and used since July 2020 by the US Indo-Pacific Command (USINDOPACOM), US Army War College and the Strategic Studies Institute (SSI), in their report An Army Transformed: USINDOPACOM Hypercompetition and US Army Theater Design. The USINDOPACOM is responsible for integrated military actions in India, Vietnam, Japan, Korea, Indonesia, China, Australia, New Zealand, and Hawaii.

Contrary to the customary flows of knowledge that has traditionally arrowed from to military strategy to strategic management, this condition shapes a reverse effect from strategic management to military strategy.

== Public engagement ==
Professor Dagnino is closely involved with business practice and publicly engaged by means of governance and advisory roles, research projects, op-ed writing, and executive and professional education programs.

He works as an executive educator, commentator, and keynote speaker.

== Selected work ==
- Dagnino, G. B. (2009). "Coopetition strategy: a new kind of interfirm dynamics for value creation". In Coopetition strategy. Theory, Experiments and Cases (pp. 45–63). London: Routledge.
- Padula, G., & Dagnino, G. B. (2007). "Untangling the rise of coopetition: the intrusion of competition in a cooperative game structure". International Studies of Management & Organization, 37(2), 32-52.
- Yami, S., Castaldo, S., Dagnino, B., & Le Roy, F. (Eds.). (2010). Coopetition: winning strategies for the 21st century. Edward Elgar Publishing.
- Dagnino, G. B., & Rocco, E. (Eds.). (2009). Coopetition strategy: Theory, Experiments and Cases. London: Routledge.
- D'Aveni, R. A., Dagnino, G. B., & Smith, K. G. (2010). "The age of temporary advantage". Strategic Management Journal, 31(13), 1371-1385.
- Cennamo, C.; Dagnino, G. B.; Di Minin, A.; Lanzolla, G. (2020). "Managing Digital Transformation: Scope of Transformation and Modalities of Value Co-Generation and Delivery". California Management Review. 62 (4): 5–16.
- Picone, P. M.; Dagnino, G. B.; Minà, A. (2014). "The origin of failure: A multidisciplinary appraisal of the hubris hypothesis and proposed research agenda". Academy of Management Perspectives. 28 (4): 447–468.
