= Richard D'Aveni =

- Born: 1953 (age 72–73); Cambridge, Massachusetts, US
- Siglum: RAD
- Education: Cornell University (A.B.); Columbia University (Ph.D.)
- Occupations: Professor of Strategy at Dartmouth College, Consultant, Author, Keynote Speaker
- Known for: Hypercompetition (HC), D'Aveni's 7S framework Four Arenas Analysis
- Notable work: HC adopted as doctrine by USINDOPACOM; Changed the lexicon by coining the term HC; Two special issues on HC in academic journals
- Website: daveni.tuck.dartmouth.edu

Richard A. D'Aveni (born 1953) is an American academic, thought leader, business consultant, bestselling author and the Bakala Professor of Strategy at the Tuck School of Business at Dartmouth College. He is best known for creating a new paradigm in business strategy and coining the term “hypercompetition” which led Fortune to liken him to a modern version of Sun Tzu.

== Career ==
Hypercompetition involves rapid, fierce, and disruptive rivalry in an industry. Such industries cause shorter-term advantages, frenzied maneuvering, and proactive strikes on oligopolistic leaders of the industry. The goal is to undermine long-term advantages such as product positioning, technology and know-how, profitable strongholds, and deep pockets (financial and political clout). This is in sharp contrast to other models of business strategy, such as oligopolistic models, which rely on long-term advantages created by the same competitive advantages that hypercompetition seeks to undermine, obsolesce, mute, or neutralize.

D’Aveni was inducted into the Thinkers50 Hall of Fame in 2020 for his work on hypercompetition and additive manufacturing strategy, including strategies based on temporary advantage and disruption. He also received the Thinkers50 Distinguished Achievement Award in the category of Strategy in 2017, and the prestigious A.T. Kearney Award from the Strategic Management Society.

His areas of research include competitive strategy (Hypercompetition, Hypercompetitive Rivalries), market disruption strategy (Hypercompetition, Beating the Commodity Trap), technological strategy (The Pan-Industrial Revolution), global strategy (Strategic Supremacy), and competition between capitalist systems (Strategic Capitalism). All of these books were based on the principles first set out in Hypercompetition.

The principles of Hypercompetition were adopted as doctrine (July 2020) by the US Indo-Pacific Command (USINDOPACOM), US Army War College, and the Strategic Studies Institute in “An Army Transformed: USINDOPACOM Hypercompetition and US Army Theater Design.” The USINDOPACOM is responsible for all integrated military actions in India, Vietnam, Japan, Korea, Indonesia, China, Australia, New Zealand, and Hawaii.

D’Aveni is a frequent contributor to business publications such as Forbes, Harvard Business Review, The Financial Times, The Wall Street Journal, the Washington Post, and the MIT Sloan Management Review. He is the author of numerous academic articles in A-level journals such as Strategic Management Journal, Academy of Management Journal, Administrative Science Quarterly, Management Science and Organization Science. He has also served on the editorial boards of most of these journals, with over 20 years of service. D’Aveni is one of only a few people to have been honored with two special issues on his research.

“Hypercompetition… has had a salubrious impact on strategy research generally. The resource based-view has clearly evolved from static resources toward "dynamic capabilities," which stresses the ability to manage and organize various types of resources dynamically, and thus increasingly incorporates a more explicit hypercompetitive view of sequential advantages.” D’Aveni's publications about hypercompetition have been cited more than 10,000 times in the academic literature.

He was a World Economic Forum Fellow (1995 – 2000) and sat on the Board of Scholars of the Chief Executive Institute at Yale University. D'Aveni's other published works on organizational decline, top management teams, and vertical integration have been cited almost 10,000 times in the academic literature.

== Early life ==
Richard D'Aveni was born in Cambridge, Massachusetts in 1953. He is a Sicilian-American who grew up in an Italian-American neighborhood outside of Boston, MA.

== Education and career ==
He started his collegiate education at Cornell University’s College of Arts & Sciences and graduated with an A.B. cum laude in 1975. He majored in Government Studies and minored in Chemistry. He continued his education at Suffolk University’s School of Law (JD, 1979) and Boston University's Graduate School of Management (MBA, 1979) evening programs. He graduated from both programs cum laude. D’Aveni earned these two degrees simultaneously while working full-time on the Governor of Massachusetts’ staff and the House Speaker's staff for the State of Massachusetts.

After graduation, he became a Member of the Bar in Massachusetts and the Federal and District Court of Appeals (1979). D’Aveni then worked at Coopers & Lybrand in its tax division from 1979 to 1982 and received his CPA in 1982.

D’Aveni pursued his PhD at Columbia University’s Graduate School of Business under Donald C. Hambrick and graduated in 1987. While there, he focused on Strategic Management/Management of Organizations and completed his dissertation under the supervision of Donald C. Hambrick, past president of the Academy of Management and the leading scholar in CEOs and top management teams.

D'Aveni began his teaching career at Keenan-Flagler School of Business at the University of North Carolina, Chapel Hill as an Assistant Professor of Business Administration.

D'Aveni then became an Assistant Professor of Business Administration at the Tuck School of Business at Dartmouth College in 1988. While an Assistant Professor, he was mentored by James Brian Quinn, winner of three McKinsey Awards prior to 1980. D’Aveni advanced to the position of Associate Professor of Business Administration in 1992 and achieved tenure in 1993. Richard A. D'Aveni was promoted to Full Professor of Strategic Management in 1996 and became the distinguished Bakala Professor of Strategy in 2011, a post he held until his retirement in 2022.

During his time at the Tuck School of Business, D’Aveni was a founding faculty member of various international business schools in Israel, Japan, Mexico, and Vietnam. He taught in numerous senior executive education programs at Tuck, Bocconi, Wharton, and Yale.

While at Tuck, D’Aveni was also a popular keynote speaker for over two hundred Fortune500 companies and conferences. In addition, he acted as a strategy consultant or advisor to numerous CEOs in the Fortune 500. At one point, D’Aveni was advisor to half of the Fortune 10 CEOs. From 2000 to 2021, he was the principal advisor and sounding board for over ten patriarchs of the Forbes top 100 richest families in the world.

== Strategic principles and predictions ==
“There are few authors with the prescience that D’Aveni has had,” says strategy guru Gary Hamel. “Each of his books accurately predicted major shifts in the nature of competition and the economy.” “Mr. D’Aveni and Mr. Hamel reject formulaic management techniques in favor of a more fluid approach.”

Hypercompetition (1994) predicted the shift to temporary competitive advantage. In Beating the Commodity Trap (2010), D'Aveni predicted that hypercompetition would give way to commoditization as temporary advantages became shorter and shorter. Strategic Supremacy (2001) predicted the rise of corporate global expansion and the race to build strong spheres of influence to compensate for commoditization in western markets. In Strategic Capitalism (2012), D’Aveni predicted that global corporate competition would affect international dynamics and geopolitical strategies between certain nations. Nations using hypercompetitive principles were winning market share from nations using oligopolistic principles. To cope with these geopolitical challenges, The Pan-Industrial Revolution (2018) foresees industrial competition based on government support for 3D printing technologies that could revive manufacturing in the West over the long run. His work on corporate spheres of influence and geopolitical strategy led him to be described as "the Kissinger of corporate strategy" by Adrian Slywotzky, bestselling author of The Profit Zone and Value Migration. The Times (London) has also described D’Aveni as "strategy's answer to Realpolitik"

D’Aveni is also known for being counterintuitive and flying in the face of conventional wisdom. Hypercompetition set out to destroy the prevailing assumptions concerning competition: sustainable competitive advantage and de-escalation of rivalry, as well as other advantages hypothesized by the prevailing strategy framework, the Five Forces Model, which is based on well-known economic principles from oligopoly theory.

A precursor to Clay Christensen’s book, The Innovator’s Dilemma (1997), Hypercompetition argues that market disruption and escalating rivalry can be powerful ways to build strategic momentum. Momentum can undermine the static competitive advantages of oligopolies, by creating temporary competitive advantages that are fierce and fast-paced, as well as destroying entry barriers and escalating rivalry.

Consequently, Marketing News said "De-emphasize your reliance on the traditional static thinking of Harvard professor and competitive guru Michael Porter. Adopt more of the dynamic thinking of Dartmouth professor, Richard D'Aveni....Today's Internet marketers worship at the competitive altar of D'Aveni."

Strategic Supremacy and Strategic Capitalism argue against common economic wisdom which states that open trade will lead to American prosperity. Strategic Capitalism offers an aggressive economic strategy for hypercompetition between capitalistic nations, demonstrating how hypercompetitive methods can be used against Asian competitors. Flying in the face of the open trade movement, these books took on the Washington establishment and mainstream economists years before they recognized that Asian competitors were using hypercompetitive methods against the US, and intentionally eroding the American sphere of influence.

The Pan-industrial Revolution addresses technologies and strategies that contradict traditional industrial strategies formed by Henry Ford and other major industrialists of the 20th century. D’Aveni examines how 3D printing and additive manufacturing will radically shorten supply chains, replace wasteful subtractive manufacturing methods and allow companies to produce multiple industrial products using the same equipment. This shift will allow companies to choose scope over scale and allow firms to be more diversified than today.

Overall, D’Aveni's research led The Times (London) to call him “A pragmatist in a world dominated by Ivy League theorists, D'Aveni is the champion of dynamic strategy over static analysis”.

== Awards ==
- Inducted into the Thinkers50 Hall of Fame in 2020
- Winner of the Thinkers50 2017 Strategy Award
- Shortlisted for the Thinkers50 2019 Breakthrough Idea Award, the Thinkers50 2015 Strategy Award, and the Thinkers50 2011 Strategy Award
- Winner of the Visionary Thought Leader Award 2018, Women's Economic Forum, May 2018
- Winner of the A.T. Kearney Award from the Strategic Management Society (1987)

== Recognition of D'Aveni ==
- Acclaimed as “The Tuck School's iconic professor”
- Named among the "Seven Most Influential Strategic Theorists" by the Corporate Strategy Board, Strategy Resource Guide, 1999
- Named as one of two important management “gurus” to emerge in the mid-1990s, European Management Journal, 1996
- Listed as one of the "Top Living Business Gurus" in What's the Big Idea by Tom Davenport and Larry Prusak, Harvard Business Press 2003
- Named as one of the five American general management scholars most likely to influence management thinking in the future, by WirtschaftsWoche (Germany's Business Week)
- Likened by Fortune Magazine to a modern version of Sun Tzu, the ancient Chinese master of military strategy and author of The Art of War.

== Recognition of works ==
- 2018 Article selected for inclusion in Harvard Business Review’s 2019 Ten Must Reads on the New Machine Age, January 15, 2019
- 2015 Article selected for inclusion in Harvard Business Review's Ten Must Reads 2016: The Definitive Management Ideas of the Year, December 1, 2015
- Ranked in the top 1% of published articles in the Business category (2010 – 2014) by the Web of Science for “The Age of Temporary Advantage”
- Article nominated for SMS's McKinsey Best Paper Award, 2004
- Hypercompetition selected as one of the 20 most important strategy books of all time, according to a vote by European management faculty, Nejenrode Management Review, 1997

== Publications ==
=== Books ===
- Hypercompetition: Managing the Dynamics of Strategic Maneuvering. The Free Press, 1994 (with Robert Gunther).
- Hypercompetitive Rivalries: Competing in Highly Dynamic Environments. The Free Press, 1995 (plus Instructor’s Manual).
- Managing in Times of Disorder: Hypercompetitive Organizational Responses. Sage Publications, 1998. (Co-edited with Anne Ilinitch and Arie Lewin).
- Strategic Supremacy: How Industry Leaders Create Growth, Wealth and Power Through Spheres of Influence. The Free Press, December, 2001.
- Beating the Commodity Trap: How to Maximize Your Competitive Position and Improve Your Pricing Power. Harvard Business Press, 2010.
- Strategic Capitalism: The New Economic Strategy for Winning the Capitalist Cold War. McGraw-Hill, 2012.
- The Pan-Industrial Revolution: How New Manufacturing Titans Will Transform the World, Houghton Mifflin Harcourt, 2018.

=== Selected articles ===
3D Printing and the future of manufacturing

- “How to Make 3D Printing Better,” Harvard Business Review, September 25, 2020 (with Ankush Venkatesh)
- “The 3-D Printing Playbook: Business Models for Additive Manufacturing,” Harvard Business Review, pp. 106–113, July–August, 2018, The Magazine, Selected for inclusion in Harvard Business Review’s 2019 Ten Must Reads on the New Machine Age, January 15, 2019
- “The 3-D Printing Revolution,” Harvard Business Review, May, 2015. Selected for inclusion in Harvard Business Review’s Ten Must Reads 2016: The Definitive Management Ideas of the Year
- “3-D Printing Will Change the World,” Harvard Business Review, March 10, 2013 3-D Printing Will Change the World
- “The Time to Think About the 3D Printed Future,” Harvard Business Review, May 2015 The Time to Think About the 3D-Printed Future Is Now
- “3D Printing might Revive Conglomerates in the Long-term,” Harvard Business Review, May 2015 3D Printing Will Revive Conglomerates
- “Get your Organization Ready for 3D Printing,” Harvard Business Review, June 2015 Get Your Organization Ready for 3D Printing
- “The End of Focus: A New Wave of Manufacturers will Choose Scope over Scale,” MIT/Sloan Management Review, Digital Edition, Reprint #58413, Summer, 2017 Choosing Scope Over Focus
- “Choosing Scope Over Scale,” MIT/Sloan Management Review, Summer 2017
- “2020: A Space Odyssey.” Forbes, Feb 2021 (with Ankush Venkatesh) 2020: A Space Odyssey
- “The Coronavirus Won’t Boost 3D Printing.” Forbes, Feb 2020 The Coronavirus Won’t Boost 3D Printing
- “3D Printing Ad Astra.” Forbes, Oct 2019 3D Printing Ad Astra
- “Transforming the Digital Factory.” Forbes, May 2019 Transforming the Digital Factory
- “How 3D Printing Can Jumpstart Developing Economies.” Forbes, Mar 2019 How 3-D Printing Can Jumpstart Developing Economies
- “The Silver Lining in the US Manufacturing Slowdown.” Forbes, Jan 2019 The Silver Lining In The U.S. Manufacturing Slowdown
- “Who Needs the Paris Climate Accords When You Have 3D Printing?” Forbes, Aug 2017 Who Needs The Paris Climate Accords When You Have 3D Printing?
- “Ford Motor Company and Choosing to Lose.” Forbes, May 2017 Ford Motor And Choosing To Lose
- “Printing the Future: The Last Bastion of Blue Collar Labor is About to Fall.” Forbes, Apr 2017, Printing The Future: The Last Bastion Of Blue Collar Labor Is About To Fall
- “Tesla’s Sky-High Stock Is A Sign of Wall Street Losing Its Focus on Focus.” Forbes, Apr 2017 Tesla's Sky-High Stock Is A Sign Of Wall Street Losing Its Focus On Focus

Temporary competitive advantage and hypercompetition

- “When Consumers Win, Who Loses?” Harvard Business Review, September 1, 2012 When Consumers Win, Who Loses?
- “Mapping Your Competitive Position,” Harvard Business Review, November, 2007 Mapping Your Competitive Position
- “The Empire Strikes Back: Counter Revolutionary Strategies for Industry Leaders.” Harvard Business Review, November, 2002, pp. 66–74
- “Jack Welch in Retrospect: Transformation Good and Bad”, Forbes, Mar 2020 Jack Welch In Retrospect: Transformation Good And Bad
- “An IPO for the PO.” Forbes, Nov 2013 An IPO For The P.O.
- “The Rise of Hypercompetition in the US Manufacturing Sector, 1950 to 2002.” SSRN, 2004 (with L.G. Thomas). Nominated for the SMS’s McKinsey Best Paper Award, October, 2004
- “Strategic Supremacy through Disruption and Dominance.” MIT Sloan Management Review, spring 1999, 40(3): 127–135
- “Waking Up to the New Era of Hypercompetition.” The Washington Quarterly, winter 1998
- “The Age of Temporary Advantage,” Strategic Management Journal, December 2010, 31(13): 1371-1385 (with Giovanni Battista Dagnino and Ken G. Smith)

Global strategy, spheres of influence, and geopolitical maneuvering

- “Leaders of the Pack: A Look at Strategies for Securing Market Domination—and Keeping It.” Wall Street Journal, March 3–4, 2007, Leaders of the Pack
- “Spheres of Influence: Constructing a Forcefield to Deflect Competitors” Financial Times of London, Friday, August 16, 2002, p. 9
- “The China Bubble,” Foreign Policy, September 1, 2012 The China Bubble
- “A Better Way for Trump to Respond to China.” Forbes, May 2017 A Better Way For Trump To Respond To China
- “America Goes to Rehab: The Shutdown and Kicking the Habit of Crackonomics.” Forbes, Oct 2013, America Goes To Rehab: The Shutdown And Kicking The Habit Of Crackonomics
- “Crackonomics: An Economy and An Economic Theory on Crack.” Forbes, Sep 2013 Crackonomics: An Economy And An Economic Theory On Crack
- “Corporate Spheres of Influence.” MIT Sloan Management Review, summer, 2004, 45(4):38-46
- “The Balance of Power.” MIT Sloan Management Review, summer, 2004 The Balance of Power
- “Competitive Pressure Systems: Mapping and Managing Multi-market Contact.” MIT Sloan Management Review, fall, 2002, 44(1):39-49 (SMR Best Seller List)
