= Cers =

Cers may refer to:

- Cers (wind), very strong wind in the bas-Languedoc region of France
- Cers, Hérault, France
- CERS Cup, a roller hockey competition organized by the Comitée Européen de Rink-Hockey
- CERS (Centre for Relationship Marketing and Service Management), a research centre at the Hanken School of Economics, Finland
- Centre D'Etudes et de Recherches Scientifiques, a Syrian government agency
- Ceramide synthase (CerS), an enzyme of the endoplasmic reticulum that catalyzes the synthesis of ceramide

== See also ==
- Cer (disambiguation)
