= Gregory Koutmos =

Dr. Gregory Koutmos is Gerald M. Levin Professor of Finance and Chair of the Finance Department of the Charles F. Dolan School of Business at Fairfield University in Fairfield, Connecticut. He is an authority in the field of financial markets volatility, equilibrium asset pricing models, and fixed income securities and risk hedging.

== Life and career ==
Koutmas received an honorary degree from the Hanken School of Economics, one of the oldest business schools in the Nordic countries, in 2010. His involvement with the school includes traveling to Helsinki, Finland, to present a seminar to post-graduate students, participating as an advisor for doctoral dissertations and serving as an opponent during public defense. He has also done joint research with members of the school's faculty.

His work has been presented at national and international conferences and he has published articles in such journals as the Journal of International Money and Finance, the Financial Review, the Journal of Business Finance and Accounting and the Journal of Economics and Business. Dr. Koutmos is an associate editor for the Financial Review and the Multinational Finance Journal. He is also a founding member of the Multinational Finance Society.

Dr. Koutmos earned a Bachelor of Science degree in economics and business from the Graduate School of Business and Economic Studies in his native Greece. He also holds a Master of Arts degree in economics from City College of New York and a doctorate in finance from the CUNY Graduate Center. Prior to joining Fairfield in 1993, he was an assistant professor at The Catholic University of America.
