= Service-dominant logic =

Framework in behavioral economics

Service-dominant (S-D) logic, in behavioral economics, is an alternative theoretical framework for explaining value creation, through exchange, among configurations of actors. It is a dominant logic. The underlying idea of S-D logic is that humans apply their competences to benefit others and reciprocally benefit from others' applied competences through service-for-service exchange.

Service-dominant logic has been developed by Stephen Vargo and Robert Lusch. The goal of developing S-D logic is to contribute to the understanding of human value co-creation, by developing an alternative to traditional logics of exchange.

Since Vargo and Lush published the first S-D logic article, "Evolving to a New Dominant Logic for Marketing", (Note: For this work, Lusch and Vargo have been awarded the Harold H. Maynard Award by the American Marketing Association for "significant contribution to marketing theory and thought" and the Sheth Foundation Award for "long term contributions to the field of marketing.") in 2004, S-D logic has become a collaborative effort of numerous scholars across disciplines and it has been continually extended and elaborated (most frequently by Vargo and Lusch). Among the most important extensions have been (1) the development of service ecosystems perspective that allows a more holistic, dynamic, and systemic perspective of value creation and (2) the emphasis of institutions and institutional arrangements as coordination mechanisms in such systems.

== The core ==
At the core of S-D logic is the idea all exchanges can be viewed in terms of service-for-service exchange, the reciprocal application of resources for others' benefit. Focus on service (singular) steers attention to the process, patterns, and benefits of exchange, rather than the units of output that are exchanged (e.g., goods). S-D logic argues that in order to create value, that is to maintain and increase wellbeing and viability, actors engage in interdependent and reciprocally beneficial service exchange. Hence, value creation occurs in networks in which resources are exchanged among multiple actors and is therefore more accurately conceptualized as value cocreation. Recently, S-D logic has moved toward a dynamic, systems orientation in which value cocreation is coordinated through shared institutions (norms, symbols, and other heuristics), often massive-scale resource integration and service exchange processes.

=== Axioms and foundational premises ===
The core ideas of S-D logic are formulated into foundational premises. Vargo and Lusch put forth the original eight foundational premises of S-D logic in the seminal, 2004 article. Since then, the foundational premises have gone through modifications and additional premises have been added as S-D logic has been extended and elaborated. Currently, S-D logic has eleven foundational premises (FPs). Five of these have been identified the axioms of S-D logic, from which the other FPs could be derived.

| | S-D logic axioms and foundational premises |
|---|---|
| Axiom 1/FP1 | Service is the fundamental basis of exchange. |
| FP2 | Indirect exchange masks the fundamental basis of exchange. |
| FP3 | Goods are a distribution mechanism for service provision. |
| FP4 | Operant resources are the fundamental source of strategic benefit. |
| FP5 | All economies are service economies. |
| Axiom 2/FP6 | Value is cocreated by multiple actors, always including the beneficiary. |
| FP7 | Actors cannot deliver value but can participate in the creation and offering of value propositions. |
| FP8 | A service-centered view is inherently customer oriented and relational. |
| Axiom 3/FP9 | All social and economic actors are resource integrators. |
| Axiom 4/FP10 | Value is always uniquely and phenomenologically determined by the beneficiary. |
| Axiom 5/FP11 | Value cocreation is coordinated through actor-generated institutions and institutional arrangements. |

The first axiom (FP1) 'Service is the fundamental basis of exchange' is based on the previously introduced definition of service as the application of operant resources (primarily knowledge and skill) for the benefit of another actor. S-D logic argues that it is always fundamentally service, rather than goods, per se, that actors exchange as they strive to become better off. This 'service' (singular), a process, should not be confused with 'services', (usually plural), usually intended to denote a unit of (intangible) output, which is associated with goods dominant (G-D) logic. The first axiom is at the heart of S-D logic, and thus foundational to the other FPs. For example, it implies that (1) goods are distribution mechanisms for service provision (FP3) and (2) all economies are service economies (FP5). It also follows that money, when it is involved in exchanges, represents rights to future service. In other words, money can be viewed as a placeholder for future service and can be understood as a form of indirect service exchange that often masks the fundamental basis of exchange (FP2).

The second axiom (FP6), 'Value is cocreated by multiple actors, always including the beneficiary', contradicts the traditional worldview, in which firms are seen as the sole creator of value. Rather, it suggests that value is something that is always cocreated through the interaction of actors, either directly or indirectly (e.g., through goods). This axiom also enables one to see more clearly that the service-oriented view is inherently relational, because value does not arise prior to exchange transaction, but rather following it, in the use of the exchanged resources, in a particular context and in conjunction with resources provided by other service providers. This value creation is seen as unfolding, over time, with a consequence of continuing social and economic exchange, implicit contracts, and relational norms. The original scope for this axiom was intended to shift the primary locus of value creation from the firm's sphere to the customer's and from the primacy of value-in-exchange, toward the primacy of value-in-use. More recently, S-D logic has begun to use to term value-in-context to capture the notion that value must be understood in the context of the beneficiary's world and the associated resources and other actors. This collaborative nature of value creation is best viewed from a higher level of aggregation than the dyad (e.g., meso- or macro levels). That is, value co-creation through service-for-service exchange is at the very heart of society. It is also important to distinguish between co-production and the co-creation of value. Co-production refers to the customer's participation in the creation of the value-proposition (the firms offering), such as through co-design, customer-assembly, self-service, etc. Co-production is thus relatively optional and its advisability depends on a host of firm and customer conditions. This is different from co-creation of value, which is intended to capture the essential nature of value creation: it always involves the beneficiary's participation (through use, integration with other resources, etc.,) in some manner.

The third axiom (FP9) 'All social and economic actors are resource integrators' highlights that all actors are, fundamentally, not only providing service but also integrating resources, from various resources. Thus, the concept of resource-integrator does not just apply to the actor typically referred to as a "producer" (e.g., the firm), but also, to a whole range of other actors, including what is usually referred to as the "consumer" or the "customer". It sets the stage for thinking about the mechanics and the networked nature of value co-creation, as well as the process through which the resources for service provision are created or emerge, the patterns of resource integration and the availability of resources from various market-facing, public, and private sources. It is through the resource integration and its many possible explicit and implicit combinations, facets, and intricacies that value is cocreated.

In the fourth axiom (FP10) of S-D logic, 'Value is always uniquely and phenomenologically determined by the beneficiary', the term 'beneficiary' reflects the generic nature of actors. In reciprocal service exchange all actors are both providers and beneficiaries. This axiom reinforces that value is experiential. The key message of this axiom is that all value propositions (e.g., goods, service provision, etc.) are perceived and integrated differently by each actor and thus, value is also uniquely experienced and determined. That is, value must be understood in terms of the holistic combination of resources that lead to it, in the context of other (potential) resources. It is thus always unique to a single actor and, it follows, can only be determined by that actor, or at least with the actor as the central referent.

The fifth axiom (FP11) 'Value cocreation is coordinated through actor-generated institutions and institutional arrangements' draws attention to the role of institutions and the process of institutionalization in value cocreation. Here the term institution does not refer to an organization. Instead, institutions are humanly devised rules, norms, and beliefs that enable and constrain action and make social life predictable and meaningful. Institutions and institutional arrangements—higher-order sets of interrelated institutions—enable actors to accomplish an ever-increasing level of service exchange and value cocreation under time and cognitive constraints in service ecosystems. This benefit, however, comes at a potential expense, as institutionalization can also lead to lock-in.

=== Service ecosystems perspective ===
To fully unlock the complex nature of value cocreation within the society, S-D logic has recently introduced the concept of a service ecosystem. As actors specialize in providing ever more sophisticated configurations of applied resources for each other, the systemic dependencies and interdependencies among them result as the emergence of complex exchange systems. S-D logic uses the term 'ecosystems' to identify these systems because it denotes actor–environmental interaction and energy flow. More specifically, the term 'service ecosystem' is used to identify the particular kind of critical flow—mutual service provision. Service ecosystems are defined in S-D logic as "relatively self-contained, self-adjusting systems of resource-integrating actors connected by shared institutional arrangements and mutual value creation through service exchange.".

The service ecosystems concept is similar to the service systems concept of service science (Service science, management and engineering, e.g., Maglio et al. 2009), defined as "a configuration of people, technologies, and other resources that interact with other service systems to create mutual value". However, the service ecosystem definition in S-D logic emphasizes the more general role of institutions, rather than technology. Likewise, the service ecosystems conceptualization is somewhat similar to Layton's (e.g., 2011) conceptualization of a marketing system. However, he sees both knowledge and institutions as environmental, or exogenous, to marketing systems, whereas in S-D logic they are seen actor-generated and endogenous to service ecosystems.

=== Narrative ===
The five axioms and the service ecosystems perspective help to communicate an S-D logic narrative of value cocreation – the central focus of this alternative worldview. This narrative is recursive over time, as actors integrate resources, provide reciprocal-service and cocreate value through "holistic, meaning-laden experiences in nested and overlapping service ecosystems, governed and evaluated through their institutional arrangements" (Vargo and Lusch 2016, p. 7)

=== Service platforms ===
It is a modular structure that encompasses tangible and intangible components and facilitates the interaction of actors and resources. They exploit the liquefaction of resources and improve their density. They serve and are present in the daily exchanges of services between the actors. There are two important aspects in service platforms: Modular Layered Architecture and Resource Density: A united set of skills and specialized knowledge that easily connect with heterogeneous products. The protocols or rules of exchange are a set of rules for the exchange of service and integration of resources in a service platform which affect the extent or the capacity to innovate in services and define which exchanges and which resources are valid. (Satish Nambisan, s.f.)

=== New service development ===
Fitzsimmons describes innovation in two ways, the first as the process of creating something new and the second the result or the product of that process, which can be an improvement or a modification in an existing service. Service innovations fall into two categories: Radical innovations: which are the services, systems or proposals that did not exist before. Incremental innovations: are improvements and changes in existing services. The new service development cycle (NSD) is divided into two: the planning phase and the implementation phase. In the planning phase enters what we know as: development and analysis while in the execution phase enters the design and launch. The elements of the Services design are like a detailed blueprint that communicate customers with employees so they are aware of what is expected to be given and received.

== Applications ==
S-D logic was quickly adopted throughout the world of marketing and services research, and also many related research domains. For a complete overview of the dissemination and institutionalisation of S-D logic in research, see Ehrenthal, Gruen and Hofstetter (2021).

Within marketing, S-D logic has been applied to virtually all of its sub-disciplines. In supply chain management and logistics, scholars have started to think in terms of value networks and systems and focus on cocreation due to the influence of S-D logic (see e.g. Flint and Mentzer, 2006; Tokman and Beitelspacher, 2011, Yazdanparast, Manuj, and Swartz, 2010). S-D logic was also linked with branding and brand cocreation early on and identified as the natural ally of consumer culture theory (CCT). S-D logic is shown to facilitate a seamless integration of ethical accountability in marketing decision-making and used to guide practitioners to achieve and sustain strategic advantage. Recently, S-D logic has also been applied to marketing sub-disciplines such as international marketing and social marketing.

The S-D logic framework has also found considerable resonance outside of marketing. S-D logic has been applied in such diverse fields as information systems, health disciplines (see e.g. Hardyman, Daunt, & Kitchener, 2015; Rehman, Dean, & Pires, 2012), arts philosophy, tourism management (see e.g. FitzPatrick, Davey, Muller, & Davey, 2013), public management and innovation studies.

Moreover, scholars are extending the S-D logic with applicable management tools such as the Service-Dominant Strategy Canvas ( Lüftenegger, Comuzzi and Grefen, 2015) and the Service-Dominant Business Model Radar ( Lüftenegger, 2014).

== Service-dominant orientation ==
Service-dominant orientation extends service-dominant logic from a general theory of exchange to the level of firm strategy. It refers to the extent to which a firm's strategic posture reflects S-D logic principles, above all the commitment to create value together with customers rather than for them. The concept was first proposed in a series of conference papers by Ingo O. Karpen, Liliana L. Bove and Alexander Josiassen in 2007 and 2008, the later of which set out five dimensions of the orientation: experience, relational, co-production, capabilities and process-flow orientation.

Karpen, Bove and Lukas subsequently developed the idea into a conceptual model, specifying six interaction capabilities through which a firm enacts the orientation: individuated, relational, ethical, empowered, developmental and concerted. Together these constitute what they term a co-creation capability, by which a firm aligns itself with its customers and other partners in its value network.

A measurement instrument for the construct was developed and validated by Karpen, Bove, Lukas and Zyphur. In studies of retail banking and automotive firms they reported that a service-dominant orientation was positively associated with customers' perceived value, trust and affective commitment, and with market performance, which in turn was associated with financial performance.

== Conducting Service-Dominant logic research ==
Analysing more than 1700 scientific publications using Service-dominant logic, Ehrenthal, Gruen and Hofstetter (2021) identify the following basic approaches, good practices, and quality criteria for conducting (and reviewing) Service-dominant logic research:

| Research goal | Applying | Extending | Testing |
|---|---|---|---|
| Specific goal | Applying S-D logic to some phenomenon | Extending some theory, concept, method using S-D logic | Testing some theory, concept, method using S-D logic |
| Research type | Conceptual | Conceptual/empirical | Empirical |
| Grounding in S-D logic | Transcend phenomenon into S-D logic, using all FPs, pronouncing FPs as needed, potentially starting with FP6 | Identify and overcome G-D boundaries by applying S-D logic, using all FPs, pronouncing FPs as needed, with special relation to FP1 | Frame the issue holistically using all FPs, pronouncing FPs as needed |
| Basic approach | Contrast G-D to S-D logic in order to envision, explicate, relate, and debate the phenomenon as per the delta identified | Contrast G-D logic to S-D logic in order to identify and overcome existing shortcomings | Contrast G-D logic to S-D logic to derive competing, testable hypotheses to judge which leads to more accurate predictions |
| Terminology | Define the minimal S-D logic terminology / vocabulary necessary. Avoid linguistic G-D relapses. | | |
| Substantive impact | Explicitly state the core contribution/value of using S-D logic. What phenomena or new aspects did S-D logic uncover / explain and how? What are implications of S-D logic and to whom do they make a difference? | | |
| Conceptual impact | How is S-D logic related to/different from the existing logic? Does S-D logic lead to different predictions/outcomes and how? How are constructs changed when using S-D logic? | | |
| Methodological impact | What methodological challenges does S-D logic help overcome and how? How does S-D logic change the way that research is conducted? How does S-D logic enable generalizable methodological advances? | | |
| S-D logic impact | How does the research advance S-D logic itself? How does thought and behavior change as a result of using S-D logic? | | |

== Conferences ==
In 2005, an international group of academics led by David Ballantyne met to discuss these issues at The Otago Forum (2005, 2008, 2011), with special issues of major marketing journals emerging, as a consequence. Other international interest emerged that broadened to include service management and service science. This broadened interest is reflected in the Naples Forum on Service (2009, 2011, 2013 and 2015) that has a special focus on service systems and networks, service science and service-dominant logic. Lusch and Vargo, established the Forum on Markets and Marketing (FMM) to: (1) explore foundational and theoretical issues related to marketing, including the understanding of markets and marketing systems and (2) further the development of S-D logic. FMM has been held in 2008 at the University of New South Wales, in 2010 at Cambridge University, in 2012 at the University of Auckland, in 2014 at the CTF Service Research Center Karlstad University, Sweden and in 2016 in Venice by Warwick Manufacturing Group, University of Warwick. It is common as well for major academic conferences in marketing and service research to have special sessions and/or invitations around S-D logic.

== S-D Logic Award ==
To recognize the contributions of individuals that have worked to advance the theory and practice of S-D Logic, Robert Lusch and Stephen Vargo established the S-D Logic Award. (Note: More information about the S-D Logic award is available at sdlogic.net.) Recipients have included Evert Gummesson: Evert Gummesson, emeritus Professor, Stockholm University (2011 recipient), Jim Spohrer: Jim Spohrer, Innovation Champion & Director, IBM (2013 recipient), Irene Ng, Professor of Marketing and Service Systems, University of Warwick.

== See also ==
- Dominant logic
