= Christian Grönroos =

Finnish academic

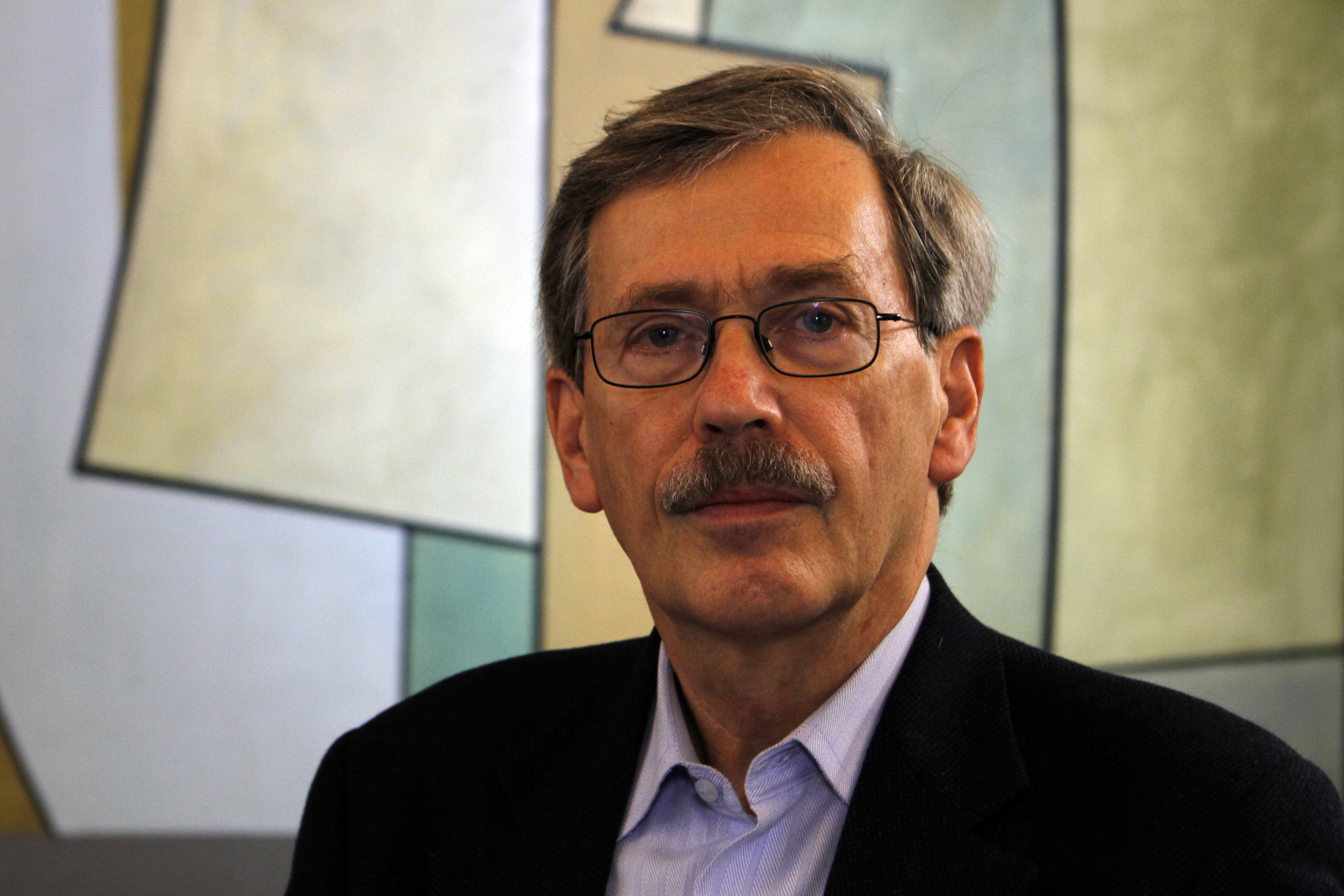
- Dr. Christian Grönroos in Helsinki 11/2011
- Born: January 16, 1947 (age 79); Helsinki, Finland
- Occupations: Emeritus Professor of Service and Relationship Marketing
- Known for: Service Research
- Website: https://www.hanken.fi/en/person/christian-gronroos

Christian Grönroos (born 16 January 1947) is a Finnish academic known for his foundational contributions to the fields of service and relationship marketing. His research interest is to "develop marketing based on a service logic: promise management and marketing; transforming manufacturing into service business."

Christian Grönroos is finlandssvensk ('Finland's-Swede'). In January 1979, he defended is doctoral dissertation entitled "Marketing of services: A study of the marketing function in service firms." The official opponent was Clas Wahlbin who would become a professor at Linköping University, and rector of Jönköping University in Sweden.

In 1984, Christian Grönroos was appointed Professor of International and Industrial Marketing at Hanken School of Economics in Finland, (Svenska handelshögskolan). In 1999, he became Professor of Service and Relationship Marketing. He founded the research and knowledge centre CERS-Centre for Relationship Marketing and Service Management. He is an Honorary Professor at Nankai University and Tianjin Normal University, P.R.China as well as at Oslo School of Management, Norway. Between 2001 and 2007 he served as Guest Professor of Service Management at Lund University Sweden.

== Professor in Marketing ==
Christian Grönroos has been selected as a "Legend in Marketing" – the first one outside North America – and his research work was compiled and featured in the "Legends in Marketing" Series, edited by Dr. Jagdish Sheth (Series Editor) and published by the Sage Publications. Other marketing scholars featured as Legends include Richard Bagozzi, Shelby Hunt, Philip Kotler, V. Kumar, Naresh Malhotra, Jagdish Sheth, Yoram Wind, and Gerald Zaltman.

== Definitions and models ==
- Service: "A service is a process that consist of activities that are more or less tangible. The activities are usually but not necessarily always taking place in the interaction between a customer and service personnel, and/or physical resources or products and/or the system of the service provider. The service is a solution to a customer's problem." (2002)
- Total perceived quality (2002)

=== His last definition of marketing (2006) ===
"Marketing is a customer focus that permeates organizational functions and processes and is geared towards making promises through value proposition, enabling the fulfilment of individual expectations created by such promises and fulfilling such expectations through support to customers' value-generating processes, thereby supporting value creation in the firm's as well as its customers' and other stakeholders' processes."
