= Evert Gummesson =

Swedish economist (1936–2023)

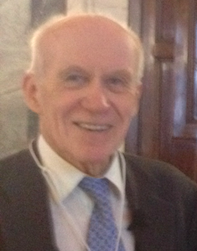
- Gummesson in 2015
- Born: Evert Gummesson; 18 January 1936
- Died: 2 April 2023 (age 87)
- Occupation: Professor
- Employer: Stockholm University
- Title: Professor Emeritus

Evert Gummesson (18 January 1936 – 2 April 2023) was Professor Emeritus of Service Marketing and Management at the Stockholm Business School, where he was formerly the Director of Research. He received his Ph.D. from Stockholm University, Stockholm School of Economics. He was a Fellow and Honorary Doctor of Hanken School of Economics, Helsinki, Finland, and a Fellow of the University of Tampere, Finland.

== Research ==
Gummesson's research interest includes services marketing, relationship marketing, service-dominant logic, organizational structure, grounded theory, case study methodology, and other research methodologies.

== Professional activities ==
He was a Senior Advisory Board member for the European Journal of Marketing.

== Publications ==
- Gummesson, E. Montserrat, D-M. Saren, M. (2022). Improving the Evaluation of Scholarly Work. Springer Int Publ. AG.
- Gummesson, E. (2017). Case theory in business and management: Reinventing case study research. Sage.
- Gummesson, E. (2011). Total relationship marketing. Routledge.
- Lovelock, C., & Gummesson, E. (2004). Whither services marketing? In search of a new paradigm and fresh perspectives. Journal of service research, 7(1), 20-41.
- Gummesson, E. (2002). Relationsmarknadsföring i tjänsteföretag: från 4 P till 30 R. Liber.
- Gummesson, E. (2000). Qualitative methods in management research. Sage.
- Gummesson, E. (1984). Resultatinriktad marknadsföring. Norstedts Juridik.

== Awards ==
- S-D Logic Award (June 2011),
- Christopher Lovelock Career Contributions to the Service Discipline Award (2000),
