= Upper echelons theory =

Management theory

The upper echelons theory, also known as the top management team theory, is a management theory published by Donald C. Hambrick and Phyllis A. Mason in 1984. It states that organizational outcomes are partially predicted by managerial background characteristics of the top level management team.

== History ==
Donald C. Hambrick, a strategic management professor, and Phyllis Mason first published the article "Upper Echelons" in 1984. Its placement of importance on a group of top executives at a company stood in contrast to what was a customary focus on the individual (e.g. the chief executive officer) in management studies. Later in 1987, Hambrick and Sydney Finkelstein added the "managerial discretion" concept to the theory, arguing that executives can either greatly influence or have little effect on an organization's outcome depending on how much discretion is available; the lack of discretion renders executive characteristics immaterial to predicting company performance. By 2005, Hambrick, Finkelstein and Ann C. Mooney introduced the "executive job demands" concept to upper echelons theory, accommodating the widely varying nature of executives' responsibilities among different organizations. The original article has been cited over 25,000 times and several additional articles in this field of research have been published over the last decades. Mason died in March 2006.

In October 2006, the Academy of Management awarded Hambrick and Mason's 1984 article as the best in Academy of Management Review's first decade, citing it as an "outstanding" work with "innovative, frame-breaking qualities". Hambrick was thus invited to publish a reflection and update on the theory, which he dedicated to Mason.

== Premise ==
The theory tries to explain a correlation between the organizational outcome and managerial background characteristics.

== Application fields ==
The theory is used in human resource management as a framework helping to hire new executives. In addition to that, the theory can be used to analyze other market competitors or listed companies and predict future strategic decisions of CEOs.
