= CERS =

Research Center in Helsinki, Finland

Centre for Relationship Marketing and Service Management
- Parent institution: Hanken School of Economics
- Established: 1994; 32 years ago
- Chair: Johanna Gummerus
- Staff: 50>
- Address: Arkadiankatu 22, 00100 Helsinki, Finland
- Location: Helsinki, Finland
- Website: www.hanken.fi/en/departments-and-centres/department-marketing/cers

CERS (Centre for Relationship Marketing and Service Management) is a research and competence centre at the Hanken School of Economics in Helsinki, Finland. The centre specialises in research on service marketing. There are currently about 50 senior researchers and doctoral students associated with CERS.

== History ==
CERS was founded in 1994 by professor Christian Grönroos and set up in cooperation with professors Martin Lindell, Sören Kock, Tore Strandvik, and Kaj Storbacka. Tore Strandvik was selected as the board's first chair (1994-2001). In 2007, CERS founder Christian Grönroos was considered Finland's most cited business professor. The centre was founded to do frontline academic research on relationship marketing and service management and to uphold the Nordic School of Marketing research traditions.

In 2023, CERS elected Johanna Gummerus as Chair. The board members are Peter Björk, Johanna Gummerus, Kristina Heinonen, Maria Holmlund-Rytkönen, Carlos Diaz Ruiz, Stefan Burggraf, and Eva Adlercreutz Carrero.

== Activity ==
By 2024, 75 doctoral theses have been defended and published at CERS. CERS maintains active co-operation with the business community and arranges workshops for its partner companies.

=== The Grönroos Service Research Award ===
Established in 2010, CERS introduced a yearly award in honour of its founder, Christian Grönroos, and his pioneering contributions to service research. The goal of this award is to inspire service marketing researchers to pioneering and innovative research that challenges and expands existing knowledge and theories in the service discipline. The award was paused between 2020 and 2022 due to the COVID-19 pandemic.

Recipients of the Grönroos Service Research Award
Year	Recipient	Institution
2024	Per Kristensson	Karlstad University
2023	Jochen Wirtz	National University of Singapore
2019	Suvi Nenonen and Kaj Storbacka	University of Auckland
2017	Mary Jo Bitner and Stephen Brown	Arizona State University
2016	Tore Strandvik	Hanken School of Economics
2015	Pierre Eiglier	Aix-Marseille Graduate School of Management
2014	Bo Edvardsson	Karlstad University
2013	Javier Reynoso	EGADE Business School
2012	Ray Fisk	Texas State University
2011	Evert Gummesson	Stockholm University School of Business
