= Richard A. Bettis =

American academic (1947-2025)

- Born: November 22, 1947
- Died: January 22, 2025 (aged 77)
- Known for: Co-editor of Strategic Management Journal (2007–2015); President of Strategic Management Society; coining "dominant logic" (with C. K. Prahalad)

Richard A. Bettis (November 22, 1947 – January 22, 2025) was the Ellison Distinguished Professor of Strategy and Entrepreneurship at the Kenan-Flagler Business School, University of North Carolina at Chapel Hill. He is a former president of the Strategic Management Society and was the Co-Editor of Strategic Management Journal from 2007-2015.

In 1986, Bettis and his co-author C.K. Prahalad coined the term dominant logic to describe deep-set cultural norms and thought patterns that drive managerial action in firms.
