= Dominant logic =

Dominant logic relates to the main means a company uses to make a profit. In essence, it is an interpretation of how a company has succeeded. It describes the cultural norms and beliefs that the company espouses.

Dominant logic can be useful when applied to corporate diversification. In this sense, dominant logic is a common way of thinking about strategy across different businesses.

Negatively, it is logic which locks a company into thinking about making money in only one way, called as "blinder effect." It is often used when talking about inefficient reasons for diversification of a company. This narrowed approach by a company can prevent a conducive environment for innovating and can stifle creativity. Dominant Logic is antipodal to the idea of using different methods and ways for generating profit. It is similar to the idea of kaizen which focuses on one process.

Recently, the concept of dominant logic is further expanded to overcome its blinder effect, for example, by nourishing dynamic dominant logic (Dwipayana et al., 2021).

Kor and Mesko argue that a firm's dominant logic can be implicit within routines, procedures and capabilities. They distinguish it from the related concepts of the dominant logic of the management team which is in turn influenced by the managerial capabilities. They view this dominant logic as changing over time in response to information in response to its absorbative capacity which is in turn influenced by the orchestration of the decision-making team, feedback and mentoring.

== History ==
In the field of strategic management, C. K. Prahalad and Richard A. Bettis described the concept of dominant logic in 1986. Prahalad and Bettis suggested that the way top managers deal with the increasing diversity of strategic decisions in a company, which are caused by acquisitions or structural changes in the core business, depends on the cognitive orientation of those top managers. Dominant logic consists of the mental maps developed through experience in the core business.

== See also ==
- Service-dominant logic
