= Stephen Vargo =

- Education: Ph.D. from University of Oklahoma
- Occupation: Professor
- Employer: University of Oklahoma

Stephen L. Vargo is an American academic and marketing scholar. He currently serves as a professor at the University of Oklahoma.

== Background ==
Vargo earned a master's degree in social psychology and a PhD in marketing. He has previously worked or taught at the University of Maryland, the University of California Riverside, the University of Cambridge, the University of Auckland, Karlstad University, and the University of Hawai'i.

== Career ==
=== Research ===
Vargo’s research focuses on marketing theory and thought, service-dominant logic in marketing, and consumers’ evaluative reference scales. He has published in journals, including the Journal of Marketing, the Journal of the Academy of Marketing Science, the Journal of Service Research, the Journal of Retailing, and the Journal of Macromarketing.

His books include The Service Dominant Logic of Marketing: Dialog, Debate, and Directions, and The Sage Handbook on Service-Dominant Logic, which he co-edited and Service-Dominant Logic: Premises, Perspectives, Possibilities, which he coauthored.

=== Editorial positions ===
Vargo currently serves on the editorial review boards of the Journal of Marketing, the Journal of the Academy of Marketing Science, Journal of Service Research, the Australasian Marketing Journal, and the Journal of Service Management and Service Science. He has also served as co-editor of a special issue of the Journal of the Academy of Marketing Science, as well as editor of special issues in other leading journals such as European Journal of Marketing and Marketing Theory, and MIS Quarterly.

== Publications ==
- Vargo, Stephen L. and Lusch, Robert F. (2004) ‘Evolving to a New Dominant Logic for Marketing’, Journal of Marketing 68 (January): 1 – 17.
- Vargo, Stephen L. and Lusch, Robert F. (2008) “Service-Dominant Logic: Continuing the Evolution,” Journal of the Academy of Marketing Science 36, 1-10.
- Vargo, Stephen L. and Lusch, Robert F. (2011) “It's all B2B…and beyond: Toward a systems perspective of the market,” Industrial Marketing Management 40, 181-187.
- Vargo, Stephen L. and Robert F. Lusch (2016), “Institutions and Axioms: An Extension and Update Of Service-Dominant Logic,” Journal of the Academy of Marketing Science, 44(1), 5-23 (DOI: 10.1007/s11747-015-0456-3)
- Vargo, Stephen L. and Robert F. Lusch (2019), Sage Handbook of Service-Dominant Logic, London: Sage.
