= CTF Service Research Center =

Research center based in Sweden

CTF, Service Research Center is a multidisciplinary research center focusing on service management and value creation through service, and is a part of Karlstad University in Sweden.

CTF was established in 1986 and recently celebrated its 30 anniversary. CTF has more than 60 researchers and doctoral students from multiple disciplines, such as business administration, psychology, and work life sciences, involved in both research and in undergraduate and graduate education. The research at CTF is organized in four major themes: Service Management, Service Innovation, Service Experience and Transformative Service Research.

CTF's operations are led by a Director Per Kristensson, supported by a management committee.

CTF currently has four visiting professors whose professorships are funded by Anne-Marie and Gustaf Ander Foundation for Media Research:

- Ruth Bolton, Arizona State University
- Thorsten Gruber, Loughborough University
- Joann Peck, Wisconsin School of Business, University of Wisconsin-Madison
- Stephen Vargo, University of Hawaii at Manoa

== Links ==
- "CTF Webpages"
