= D'Aveni's 7S framework =

D'Aveni's 7S framework is Richard D'Aveni's approach to directing a firm in a high velocity or Hypercompetitive markets. it is designed to enable firms sustain the momentum of their competitiveness through a series of initiatives that are poised to give temporary advantages rather than just structuring the firm to achieve internal or external fit aimed at maintaining equilibrium that are designed to sustain unsustainable competitive advantages. Based on factors such as:

1. Stakeholder satisfaction.
2. Strategic soothsaying.
3. Positioning for speed.
4. Positioning for surprise.
5. Shifting the rule of the game.
6. Signaling the strategic intent.
7. Simultaneous and sequential strategic thrust.

All of these factors address the Four Arenas of Competition referred to in his book, Hypercompetition.
