= Karlstad University Press =

- Parent company: Karlstad University
- Founded: 2003
- Country of origin: Sweden
- Headquarters location: Karlstad
- Publication types: Books, Journals
- Official website: www.kau.se/kup

Karlstad University Press (KUP) is a university press affiliated with Karlstad University in Sweden. It was founded in 2003.
