= Heidi Schauman =

Economist

- Born: Heidi Henrika Soininen; 1978 (age 47–48); Pojo, Raseborg, Finland

Academic background
- Education: Hanken School of Economics

Heidi Henrika Schauman (née Soininen; born 1978) is a Finnish economist, who as of 2021 is the head of research at Danske Bank. Prior to this, she worked as the chief economist at Aktia Bank and Swedbank Finland, as well as in various roles at the Bank of Finland.

In addition to her main professional activities, Schauman is the chairman of the board of Helsinki Graduate School of Economics and holds board positions at Hanken and Hereditas and a Financial Board position of the Society of Swedish Literature. She was the Hanken Alumna of the year 2021. Heidi was awarded the Jaakko Honko medal in 2025. Schauman has previously held board positions at the Finnish Cultural Foundation and Finnish National Gallery. She also wrote as a regular columnist for the leading Swedish-language newspaper of Finland, Hufvudstadsbladet, for many years.

Schauman is an alumna of the Hanken School of Economics, where she obtained her PhD in economics, with her doctoral thesis investigating aspects of the labour market.

== Publications ==
- Soininen, Heidi: Empirical Studies on Labour Market Matching.
