= Sydney Finkelstein =

American management academic

- Education: Concordia University; London School of Economics; Columbia University
- Occupations: Author, management consultant

Sydney Finkelstein is the Steven Roth Professor of Management and faculty director of the Tuck Executive Program (TEP) at the Tuck School of Business at Dartmouth College. He is also the faculty director of the Center for Leadership at Tuck. His specialty is business leadership and strategy.

Finkelstein earned a B.Comm degree from Concordia University in 1980 and later an M.Sc. at the London School of Economics followed by a Ph.D. in Management of Organizations from Columbia University in 1988. He taught at Concordia University and the University of Southern California. He was named a Fellow of the Academy of Management in 2007, and also contributes to BBC.com and Forbes.

In 2024, Finkelstein signed a faculty letter expressing support for Dartmouth College president Sian Beilock, who ordered the arrests of 90 students and faculty members nonviolently protesting the Gaza war.

== Books and articles ==
Finkelstein has published 20 books and 79 articles. He has edited the series Advances in mergers and acquisitions. (Emerald Press).

=== Academic books ===
- Sydney Finkelstein, Donald C. Hambrick, Albert A. Cannella; Strategic leadership: theory and research on executives, top management teams, and boards; New York; Oxford University Press; 2009. According to WorldCat, the book is held in 542 libraries
- Sydney Finkelstein, Donald C. Hambrick; Strategic leadership: top executives and their effects on organizations; Minneapolis/St. Paul; West Pub. Co.; 1996.

=== Popular books ===
- Superbosses: How Exceptional Leaders Master the Flow of Talent; New York, Portfolio/Penguin; 2016.
- Why Smart Executives Fail; New York; Portfolio; 2003. The book is based on a six-year study of 51 companies and 200 interviews of business leaders.
- Think Again: Why Good Leaders Make Bad Decisions and How to Keep it From Happening to You; Boston, MA; Harvard Business Press; 2009. Co-authored with Jo Whitehead and Andrew Campbell. According to WorldCat, the book is held in 424 libraries
- Breakout strategy: meeting the challenge of double-digit growth; New York; McGraw-Hill; 2007. Co-authored with Charles Harvey and Thomas C Lawton

=== Management and Leadership ===
Finkelstein urges leaders to handle direct reports like educators. The Management professor and author said the teacher-leader meets subordinates face to face on a regular basis and convey lessons regarding life, how to become professional, and points of dexterity. Sydney Finkelstein considers revival of the talent pool as among the most essential achievements of a leader in helping the organization to survive and grow. His Book, “Superbosses: How Exceptional Leaders Master the Flow of Talent" reviews the persons in various industries capable of growing human capital efficiently more than others.
