= Strategic Management Society =

Professional society

The Strategic Management Society (SMS) is a professional organization for the advancement of strategic management. The society consists of more than 3,000 members representing various backgrounds and perspectives from more than seventy countries. Membership is composed of academics, business practitioners, and consultants. The society has been credited with being a factor in the development of strategic management as a legitimate field of scholarly endeavor. The SMS publishes the Strategic Management Journal, Strategic Entrepreneurship Journal and the Global Strategy Journal.

== History ==
The Strategic Management Society was founded at an initial meeting in London in 1981. Founding officers were elected at a second conference held in Montreal in 1982, and the founding constitution was drawn and approved at the third meeting in Paris in 1983. There were 459 original founding members of the society.

=== Former presidents ===
- Myles Shaver, 2025–2026
- Yan Anthea Zhang, 2023–2024
- Africa Ariño, 2021–2022
- Javier Gimeno, 2019–2020
- Russel Coff, 2017–2018
- Marjorie Lyles, 2015–2016
- Bob Hoskisson, 2013–2014
- Jay Barney, 2011–2012
- Joan Enric Ricart, 2009–2010
- Michael Hitt, 2007–2008
- Richard A. Bettis, 2005–2006
- Jeremy Davis, 2003–2004
- John McGee, 2000–2003
- Howard Thomas, 1997–2000
- Richard Rumelt, 1994–1997
- Carlos Cavallé, 1991–1994
- Henry Mintzberg, 1988–1991
- Derek Channon, 1985–1988
- Dan Schendel, 1982–1985

== Publications ==
=== Strategic Management Journal ===
Since its establishment in 1980, The Strategic Management Journal has been the official journal of the Strategic Management Society. It is published in 13 issues per year by Wiley-Blackwell and the current co-editors are Rajshree Agarwal, University of Maryland, Mary Benner University of Minnesota, Vibha Gaba INSEAD, Singapore, and Brian Silverman University of Toronto. According to the Journal Citation Reports, the journal has a 2012 impact factor of 3.367.

Key topics discussed in the journal are strategic resource allocation; organization structure; leadership; entrepreneurship and organizational purpose; methods and techniques for evaluating and understanding competitive, technological, social, and political environments; planning processes; and strategic decision processes.

=== Strategic Entrepreneurship Journal ===
The Strategic Entrepreneurship Journal is a quarterly publication of the Strategic Management Society. It was established in 2007 and is published by Wiley-Blackwell. The editors-in-chief are Peter Klein Baylor University, Yong Li University of Nevada Las Vegas, and David Sirmon University of Washington. According to the Journal Citation Reports, the journal has a 2012 impact factor of 1.205.

The journal covers practice of managing organizations as they deal with entrepreneurial processes and the inevitable changes and transformations that result in ten theme areas:

- Entrepreneurship and economic growth
- Change
- Risk and uncertainty
- Innovation
- Creativity, imagination and opportunities
- Strategy versus entrepreneurship
- Technology
- Social role of entrepreneurship
- Behavioral characteristics of entrepreneurial activity
- Entrepreneurial actions, innovation and appropriability

=== Global Strategy Journal ===
The Global Strategy Journal is a quarterly publication of Wiley-Blackwell published on behalf of the Strategic Management Society. The journal was established in May 2011. The editors-in-chief are Gabriel R.G. Benito (BI Norwegian Business School, Norway), Stewart Miller (Durham University, UK), and Grazia D. Santangelo (Copenhagen Business School, Denmark). The first two issues of volume one were released in May 2011 as a double issue. The first volume included two invited papers for each of the ten topic areas:

- International and global strategy
- Assembling the global enterprise
- Strategic management of the global enterprise
- Global strategy and inter-organizational networks
- Performance and global strategy
- Global strategy and the global business environment
- Strategy and location
- Comparative strategies
- Global innovation and knowledge strategies
- Global strategy and emerging economies

=== The SMS Book Series ===
The SMS Book Series is published in cooperation with Wiley-Blackwell and focuses on cutting edge concepts/topics in strategic management theory and practice. The books emphasize building and maintaining bridges between theory and practice in strategic management. The work published generates and tests theories of strategic management and it demonstrates how to learn, understand and apply these theories in practice.

== Meetings ==
=== Annual conferences ===
The SMS holds an annual conference, typically alternating between North America and Europe. Past locations include Prague, Berlin, Vancouver, San Francisco, Paris, Baltimore, San Juan, Orlando, Vienna, San Diego, Cologne, Washington, D.C.

Each conference addresses a current theme, with specific tracks addressing sub-themes, and presents multiple sessions by leading experts in the field from around the world.

=== Special conferences ===
Along with the annual conference, each year SMS organizes special conferences that focus on a particular topic or region.

== Membership ==
SMS has nearly 3,000 members from more than eighty countries. Membership is open to anyone who is active in the strategic management field, either as an academic scholar or teacher, as a business practitioner, or in a consulting capacity. There are three distinct memberships.

Emeritus membership is offered to individuals who are passed the age of 65 and have been an SMS member for at least 10 years. Student membership is offered to individuals who are enrolled full-time, in-residence at the PhD granting institution. Individuals can be SMS student members for up to five years

== Fellows ==
The Strategic Management Fellows are a group of individuals elected because of their substantial contribution to the field. There are currently 62 fellows.

== Strategy Research Foundation ==
The Strategy Research Foundation (SRF) is an initiative of the Strategic Management Society to support the generation, preservation and dissemination of new knowledge in the field of strategic management. Initially funded by the SMS, the foundation provides support, primarily in the form of research grants, to academic researchers with the aim of promoting their research and inviting them to tackle problems and issues as defined in the annual SRF call for proposals for the General Research Program and the Dissertation Research Program.
