= Cer =

Cer, or CER may refer to:

== Science and technology ==
- Control event rate, a statistical value in epidemiology
- Crossover error rate, a statistical value in a biometric system
- Comparative effectiveness research, comparison of health care intervention effectiveness
- Conditioned emotional response, a specific learned behavior or procedure

=== Computing ===
- Canonical Encoding Rules, an encoding format
- Customer edge router, in computer networking
- CER Computer (Serbian Latin: Cifarski Elektronski Računar, "Digital Electronic Computer"), series of early computers

== Places ==
- Cer (mountain), a mountain in Serbia
- Cer, Zvornik, a village in the municipality of Zvornik, Republika Srpska, Bosnia and Herzegovina
- Cer, Kičevo, a village in the municipality of Kičevo, North Macedonia
- Cherbourg – Maupertus Airport or Aéroport de Cherbourg - Maupertus (IATA airport code), an airport in France
- Chinese Eastern Railway (Chinese: 中東鐵路/中东铁路, also known as the Chinese Far East Railway), a railway in northeastern China

== Organizations ==
- Conference of European Rabbis, rabbinical alliance in Europe
- Commission for Energy Regulation, a Republic of Ireland energy regulator
- Community of European Railway and Infrastructure Companies, railway system

== Other uses ==
- Certified emission reduction, emission units
- Classic Endurance Racing, a sports car racing series founded in 2004 by Peter Auto Ltd.
- Closer Economic Relations, a free trade agreement between Australia and New Zealand
- Comparative Education Review, publication of the Comparative and International Education Society
- Currency exchange rate, rate at which one currency will be exchanged for another currency
- Keres, Greek goddess of violent death, one of the Greek primordial deities
