= Donald C. Hambrick =

Management professor

- Born: November 27, 1946 (age 79)
- Education: Pennsylvania State University (PhD); Harvard Business School (MBA); University of Colorado Boulder (BS)
- Occupations: Professor and Consultant
- Known for: Strategy Diamond; Upper echelons theory
- Website: www.personal.psu.edu/faculty/d/c/dch14/index.html

Donald C. Hambrick (born November 27, 1946) is Evan Pugh Professor and the Smeal Chaired Professor of Management, Smeal College of Business, at The Pennsylvania State University. He is also Bronfman Professor Emeritus, Columbia Business School, Columbia University. An internationally recognized scholar in the field of top management, Don Hambrick is the author of numerous articles, chapters, and books on the topics of strategy formulation, strategy implementation, executive staffing and incentives, and the composition and processes of top management teams.

== Education ==
He holds degrees from the University of Colorado (B.S.), Harvard University (M.B.A.), and The Pennsylvania State University (Ph.D.). He has been awarded honorary doctorates by the University of Paris (Panthéon-Assas) (Sorbonne) (2010), the University of Antwerp (2013), Erasmus University (Rotterdam) (2013), and the University of Passau (2019). He is a past president of the Academy of Management.

== Current Research ==
Hambrick's current research focuses on executive psychology, top management team dynamics, and the history and evolution of the field of strategic management.

== Expertise ==
Hambrick is an expert in topics related to CEOs and top management teams, executive leadership, corporate governance, and strategy formulation and implementation.
