= Hypercompetition =

Hypercompetition, a term first coined in business strategy by Richard D'Aveni, describes a dynamic competitive world in which no action or advantage can be sustained for long. Hypercompetition is a key feature of the new global digital economy. Not only is there more competition, there is also tougher and smarter competition. It is a state in which the rate of change in the competitive rules of the game are in such flux that only the most adaptive, fleet, and nimble organizations will survive. Hypercompetitive markets are also characterized by a "quick-strike mentality" to disrupt, neutralize, or moot the competitive advantage of market leaders and important rivals.

Often a hypercompetitive market is triggered by new technologies, new offerings, and falling entry barriers that cause market leaders to be dethroned, causing standards and rules to be in flux. This results in near chaotic competition that confuses management and causes the destruction of the core competencies of established firms. While most firms are blindsided and lose their competitive advantage, other firms find opportunities to enrich themselves through reinvention and rapid escalation of competition.

The empirical evidence for the concept of hypercompetition is somewhat equivocal. McNamara, Vaaler and Devers, Vaaler and McNamara, as well as Lindskov, Sund, and Dreyer, have for example contested the existence of a universal state of hypercompetition. Lindskov, Sund and Dreyer conclude that instead it may be that some industries, regions or time-periods could be associated to hypercompetition, others not. In later work studying the technology sector in particular, the same authors suggest that hypercompetition may be linked to the industry life cycle.

In D'Aveni's conceptualization of hypercompetition, the only source of a truly sustainable competitive advantage is a company's ability to string together a sequence of temporary advantages. Firms manage their dynamic strategic interactions with competitors by means of frequent movements and counter-movements that maintain a relative position of strength in each of four arenas.

According to D'Aveni's model, competition unfolds in a series of dynamic strategic interactions in four arena's: cost/quality, timing and know-how, strongholds, and deep pockets. Each of the four arenas represents different types of competitive advantage. The price/quality arena represents the competitive advantage from product positioning. The timing and know-how arena represents the competitive advantage from tacit and explicit knowledge and the timing of their deployment – first movers, fast followers and cautious followers. The strongholds arena represents the competitive advantage from high barriers of entry, but more importantly, from the ability to circumvent, neutralize, and destroy entry barriers. The deep pockets arena represents the competitive advantage from size including financial and political clout.

== The Four Arenas ==
=== Price / Quality ===
In his book Competitive Strategy, Michael Porter stated that there are only two basic competitive advantages, and thus only two main generic strategies: cost leadership and differentiation, and further, that attempts to achieve both at once will result in doing neither well. Porter assumes a tradeoff between quality and price.

In contrast, D'Aveni takes a dynamic and multidimensional view of price and quality relationships using graphical analysis. By plotting price vs. quality for various marketing strategies, it is possible to plot the movements of different firms, creating a multidimensional view of the overall market. Adding a time dimension to this analysis creates a more dynamic view.

Graphical analysis also reveals strategic groups, if any, that develop around different points on the graph. D'Aveni's price-quality mapping not only subsumes Porter's strategic groups, allowing not only for "within-segment positioning" but also "between-segment position", where nearby clusters can begin to directly or indirectly compete with firms that previously were not direct competitors.

Competition in the first arena, price/quality, occurs via seven dynamic strategic interactions: price wars, quality and price positioning, "the middle path", "cover all niches", outflanking and niching, the move toward an ultimate value marketplace, and escaping from the ultimate value marketplace by restarting the cycle.

Based on research using price-quality graphs, some interesting lessons have been learned. Consider the price-quality graph below which shows all of the iPods that were released over a five-year period. This graph illustrates many of the dynamic principles in hypercompetition including movement towards the ultimate value (lower right hand corner), and how Apple built momentum toward it. Apple led the race to the bottom, but planned for the future by inventing the iPhone, which obsolesced the portable music player market. In addition, Apple maintained a full line of iPods that made it difficult to tell which product was stuck in the middle. In a sense, almost all the products were stuck in the middle between two other products.

Even more insights can be found if competitors are plotted on the same graph or if different types of quality are used for the graph. It is preferable to use the primary quality in the eyes of the consumer. Primary quality is determined by what is most important to consumers. Other definitions of quality are considered secondary qualities which can be used to redefine the primary quality and create a new playing field.

Because different segments of a market may view primary quality differently, it is sometimes best to perform price/quality analyses for different segments. For example, the sports car segment of the automobile market primarily values engine performance. Meanwhile, the soccer mom segment primarily values safety; the commuter segment primarily values fuel efficiency; and the luxury segment primarily values brand perception such as product prestige. Surprisingly, reliability is not on this list because it is now table stakes, and not a point of differentiation.

Also surprisingly, safety features such as seatbelts were not valued when they cost $150 each. But when competitors produced seatbelts in such volume that they only cost $10 each, seatbelts became much more important, eventually being mandated by the government. So, it is not only the consumers that define perceived quality, but competition and regulations can affect it as well.

=== Timing and know-how ===
The second arena for hypercompetition is the timing and know-how arena. This arena represents the true chess game of innovation and imitation that underlies product evolution and the successful adaptations firms undertake to stay in the game. While all of the arenas incorporate an explicit hypercompetitive view of sequential advantages, this arena's focus on moves and countermoves implicitly explores the ability to manage and organize various types of resources dynamically.

This arena of competition is based on knowledge and the timing with which it is deployed. A firm that has the skills to be a 'first mover' and arrives first in a market has achieved a timing advantage. A knowledge advantage includes the technology underlying the product, knowledge about customers, the skills that underlie each stage of a firm's value-added chain, as well as the specialized knowledge that underlies culture, and expert knowledge of physical and digital assets. This knowledge may be tacit or explicit. In addition, the knowledge may be the know-how associated with a new method of doing business that allows the firm to create an entirely new product, market, service or business model. This arena also implies that all knowledge, even the skills to invent a new business model and the skills needed to be a first-mover or follower, erodes with hypercompetitive maneuvering.

The first level is the static resource-based view. The second level represents hypercompetition's contribution to dynamic capabilities. The third level is hypercompetition's contribution to knowledge-based theories of competitive advantage.

D'Aveni identifies six dynamic strategic interactions that drive competition in this arena:

- capturing first-mover advantages;
- imitation and improvement by followers;
- creating impediments to imitation;
- overcoming the impediments;
- transformation or leapfrogging;
- downstream vertical integration.

Timing moves are predicated on neutralizing or destroying the opponent's advantages. A first mover tries to create impediments on imitation by subsequent followers. The followers replicate the leader's resource base and overcome these impediments. They gradually become better and faster at imitation until the knowledge becomes commoditized or "table stakes".

The first mover then adopts a strategy of leapfrogging innovations, building on large technological advantages that require entirely new resources and know-how. These moves become increasingly more expensive and risky for the firm. Eventually because of the speed with which imitators catch up, the leapfrogging strategy becomes unsustainable.

The three major conclusions to take away from the timing and know-how arena are:

1. Speed. This cycle of dynamic strategic interactions is speeding up, driving more frequent transformations, leapfrog moves, and downstream vertical integration. Knowledge/know-how is commoditizing faster and first-mover advantages are eroding more quickly as well.
2. Aggressiveness. Even though many of these timing and know-how advantages appear in Porter's five forces as static barriers to entry, hypercompetition urges potential entrants to use these advantages to destroy, neutralize or moot the strengths of rivals. Porter's model represents established firms on the defense.D'Aveni's model represents outsiders seeking to get in or to grow their positions.
3. Imitation and Improvement. Although imitation is frequently discussed, D'Aveni's addition of the word "improvement" changes the playing field. Whereas many authors only discuss pure imitation (knockoffs), D'Aveni notes that it is often the improvements made by imitators that change the nature of the game.

=== Strongholds ===
The third arena is based on strongholds – a firm's product and geographic position best protected by barriers to entry and substitutes. These barriers include economies of scale, product differentiation, capital investments, switching costs, access to distribution channels, cost advantages other than scale, and government policies.

Firms compete for different positions in their competitive space. A competitive space can be mapped using a two dimensional grid based on product (rows) and geography (columns). A firm and its rivals can be visualized by plotting them on this grid. If any firm takes significant market share in a specific geo-product position, it has created a stronghold which it will attempt to protect using its own barriers to entry. Once a firm has established a secure stronghold, it typically will diversify around that core to create a sphere of influence. Each geo-product position should have a defensive or offensive purpose such as buffer zones and forward positions, respectively.

Firms try to take positions that not only allow them to protect their core stronghold but also enable strikes into the core or buffer zones of rivals. Frequently some spheres of influence overlap. If they do, they may eventually settle on a tacit division of the market. Otherwise, the firms perpetually engage in skirmishes, use allies to fight a "proxy war," or continue to diversify until they get spread too thin. Many other strategies for the dynamic strategic interaction of strongholds have been discovered by empirical studies by D'Aveni.

Not all firms are able to create a stronghold or sphere of influence. However, niche firms create strongholds or spheres of influence within tiny slivers of the competitive space. Similarly, not all industries can be described by hypercompetition. Competitive advantages can be institutionalized by government regulations and patents, giving firms permanent entry barriers and localized monopolies.

D'Aveni has found that being hypercompetitive is not black or white. Some industries are hybrids. Firms can establish détente using oligopolistic behaviors with a select group of competitors so that they can free up resources to hypercompete against different rivals or to grow into new markets. For example, in the 1990s, the American car companies generally did not compete aggressively against each other so that they could focus on competition against Asian rivals. Also in the 1990s, the big three airlines (Delta, United, American) acquired failing airlines in such a way that they ended up with approximately equal market shares and some relatively uncontested airports. This allowed them to free up resources for hypercompeting against Continental, Northwest, Trans World Airlines, Eastern and Pan Am, driving some of them into bankruptcy. As these weaker rivals failed, the big 3 continued to acquire gates left behind by their rivals, resulting in a strengthening of the oligopoly among the big three. This then freed up resources for the big 3 to compete for international routes.

The strongholds arena is the best example of the dynamic versus static approaches. In Porter's concept of "five forces"", entry barriers are present or not, and if present, reduce the threat of new entrants coming into the industry to increase competition. D'Aveni's strategic interactions, on the other hand, posit strategies for jumping over or slipping under or going around entry barriers, so that even in the presence of strong entry barriers, incumbent firms should not feel safe. D'Aveni suggests that firms need to unequivocally signal their intent to defend their strongholds or alternatively to attack those of their rivals. D'Aveni's model about spheres of influence and the balance of power explore a whole new level of competition. In contrast to those who have looked at multimarket contacts, D'Aveni's model does not predict mutual forbearance as the only outcome of multimarket contact. He argues that in some cases the multimarket contacts will result in escalating rivalry when those contacts have created separate coalitions with an imbalance of power or when the coalitions lack cohesiveness.

The strongholds arena maps onto Porter's entry barriers in the five forces model, but again the hypercompetition model is dynamic rather than static. Entry barriers can be erected in a number of ways, but while entry barriers may temporarily slow down rivals, determined opponents can always find a way to circumvent or vault over entry barriers through employing a variety of tactics. D'Aveni has identified eight strategic interactions in this arena:

- building barriers;
- launching forays into a competitors stronghold;
- the incumbents short-run counterresponses to a guerilla attack on its home turf;
- the incumbent's delayed reaction;
- overcoming the barriers;
- long-run counterresponses to the attack;
- slow learners and the incumbent's reaction to entrants who don't get the message;
- and unstable standoffs.

Over time, a stronghold erodes as entry barriers are overcome. D'Aveni is in agreement with Peter Drucker, who long counseled that the role of marketing is innovation and the creation of new markets. Innovation begins with abandonment of the old and obsolete. The age of strategic planning is fast evolving into the era or organizational learning. Likewise, D'Aveni urges managers to reconsider and reevaluate the use of what he believes are old strategic tools and maxims.

He warns of the dangers of commitment to a given strategy or course of action. The flexible, unpredictable player may have an advantage over the inflexible, committed opponent. D'Aveni notes that, in hypercompetition, pursuit of generic strategies results in short-term advantage at best. The winning companies are the ones that successfully move up the ladder of escalating competition, not the ones that lock into a fixed position. D'Aveni is also critical of the five forces model. The best entry barrier, he argues, is maintaining the initiative, not mounting a defensive attempt to exclude new entrants.

The strongholds arena offers a substantive set of options for addressing the entry barriers once capable of providing long-term competitive advantages. Basically, hypercompetition changed the impression of rock-walled castle strongholds to sandcastles ever susceptible to new tides and constant rebuilding. Importantly, it did not depict stronghold competition as fruitless, but transitory.

=== Deep Pockets ===
Hypercompetition theory depicts the deep pockets arena as not based on unassailable advantages. Conventional views say that large firms have several deep pocket advantages including a wider margin for error, global or national reach, political power, market power, and financial clout. "Hypercompetition provides strategies that advise both large firms with deep pockets and a small agile competitor."

Starting with the conventional view, D'Aveni suggests that firms can derive advantage through a larger resource base and superior concentration of focus to crush a smaller competitor through brute force. These advantages however can be neutralized fairly quickly. "For instance, competitors can use mergers and acquisitions to develop equally-matched or even deeper-pockets… Alternatively, franchise and partnership arrangements can neutralize the [deep pocket] advantages… And, large firms always face the potential of an anti-competitive government legal action."

The strategic interactions in this arena include "drive 'em out," using the courts or Congress to derail the deep-pocketed firm, large firm thwarting the antitrust suit, small firms neutralizing the advantage of the deep pocket, and the rise of a countervailing power.

Although the deep pockets arena is the least remarkable of the four, it does offer some hope for the small firm when facing a Microsoft or a Google. "The world is changing very fast… big will not beat small anymore… it will be the fast beating the slow." In the deep-pockets arena, D'Aveni concludes that brawn is no match for brains.

== Hypercompetition vs traditional strategy ==
Hypercompetitive strategy differs from The Five Forces Model/oligopoly theory of strategy in at least four distinctive ways.

=== Stakeholder strategy ===
The Five Forces Model/oligopoly theory of strategy promotes friendly relations with rivals to prevent competition or slow it down. It fosters building oligopolistic bargains amongst rivals while improving margins by reducing the power of suppliers and buyers. Hypercompetition inspires the opposite. It fosters fiercer and faster competition amongst rivals while generating margins by creating value for customers and forming alliances with suppliers. In sum, the five forces model treats rivals nicely and suppliers and customers poorly. The hypercompetition model treats customers and suppliers nicely while treating rivals aggressively.

=== The nature of competitive advantage ===
National oligopolies and their long-term sustainable advantages were destroyed by foreign competition, an influx of technology and other disruptive forces that made it difficult to sustain competitive advantage. Hypercompetition is based on unsustainable, temporary competitive advantages. There is considerable evidence in the financial, accounting, economic, and strategy literatures that suggests an increase in temporary advantages. In macroeconomics, studies have demonstrated the steady increase in the magnitude of volatility in growth of unemployment, sales, earnings, capital expenditures and total factor productivity since 1950, suggesting that sustainable competitive advantage is becoming more difficult. In finance, research has documented an increase in the volatility of returns for US equity prices. In the strategy literature, Thomas and D'Aveni also found increased volatility and decreased duration of stock returns from 1950 to 2002.

The competitive advantage of established industry leaders has become shorter over time and more likely to erode in several studies. Market share erosion and dethronement of market leaders have been found to be more frequent over time, indicating that even the most established and profitable players are experiencing a loss of competitive advantage.

=== The relationship between rivalry and performance ===
Hypercompetition suggests that increased rivalry leads to higher performance while oligopoly theory / The Five Forces Model suggest that decreased rivalry is associated with higher performance. L. G Thomas found that rivalry and performance were positively correlated in over 200 manufacturing industries from 1950 to 1996, supporting Hypercompetition theory.

The relationship between rivalry and performance is controversial. While Porter recommended oligopolistic behavior which is based on the idea that higher competition leads to lower performance. However, in his extensive study of national economies (1990), he found the opposite. Countries with the highest levels of hypercompetition performed better in global markets than those dominated by oligopolies.

The reasons for the high-performance high-rivalry finding are numerous. They include the many significant benefits of a competitive aggressive approach. By constantly improving a product, a firm delivers superior value to its customers and generates new demand. An aggressive series of actions also delays rival responses and creates temporary monopolistic positions, allowing firms to charge premium prices and earn higher profit margins. L. G Thomas found evidence that over time, the within-industry variance of profits increased, suggesting that the positive relationship between rivalry and industry performance is partially due to a few firms that have the resources to master the art of hypercompetition. Firms that are flexible and able to bear the costs of aggressive actions become winners but the costs of aggressiveness can increase as the pace of competition intensifies. There are inefficiencies caused by rushed planning and execution including mistakes, poor judgement, and lack of coordination among departments and suppliers.

Competitive aggressiveness can be a winning strategy in newly developed markets or dynamic industries such as consumer electronics, biotechnology, and pharmaceuticals. "We've accumulated a lot of evidence that aggressiveness matters, that it really improves performance, especially in these highly dynamic environments," says Goce Andrevski, associate professor and Distinguished Faculty Fellow of Strategy at Smith School of Business. Consistent with L.G Thomas' within-industry findings, competitive aggressiveness can be successful for firms with the right resources, such as technological know-how, and networks of reliable partners and suppliers. It also has benefits when firms have the resources to generate a series of temporary advantages at a rapid pace, consistently rolling out new products, price cuts, marketing campaigns, or similar actions designed to create value for customers, confuse rivals, and disrupt the core competency of an opponent.

=== The type of strategic actions recommended ===
Sequences of temporary competitive advantages are a means of gaining momentum and destroying, mooting, or otherwise neutralizing the core competencies of oligopolists. For example, Hypercompetition includes undermining the core competence of industry leaders, building off of one's weaknesses to create surprise, and to circumvent entry barriers, making them moot.

Traditional strategy often uses SWOT (Strengths, Weaknesses, Opportunities, Threats) analysis as a tool to identify, measure and leverage core competencies. This analysis typically suggests firms leverage, strengthen, and exploit their strengths, i.e their core competencies. And, to use these strengths against the opportunities, which derive from the weaknesses of competitors. No decisive victory can be achieved by using strengths to attack weaknesses. The traditional approach leaves a rival intact and manages competition to keep its level down to a slower speed and reduce the aggressiveness of rivals, behaviors which support existing oligopolies.

In contrast, hypercompetition encourages using strengths against the strengths of rivals. To be successful at attacking the strengths of a rival, a firm must build its weaknesses so that the attack will be a surprise. In hypercompetition, only temporary advantages are possible. This suggests the surprising implication that leveraging core competencies is a mistake in hypercompetition because those strengths will often turn into disadvantages weighing down the firm with assets that create inflexibilities.

Truly decisive victories only come from strengths overwhelming strengths. In most cases, before attacking the strength of a rival, firms prepare for counterattacks and build their weaknesses. Destroying or eroding the strengths of rivals enables firms to undermine, neutralize or eventually moot their advantages. Faced with relentless withering attacks, rivals can also become exhausted and demoralized when they are constantly playing catch-up to a hypercompetitor on the loose.

== See also ==
- D'Aveni's 7S framework
