= Relationship marketing =

Form of marketing focused on customer retention

Relationship marketing is a form of marketing developed from direct response marketing campaigns that emphasizes customer retention and satisfaction rather than sales transactions. It differentiates from other forms of marketing in that it recognises the long-term value of customer relationships and extends communication beyond intrusive advertising and sales promotional messages.

With the growth of the Internet and mobile platforms, relationship marketing has continued to evolve as technology opens more collaborative and social communication channels such as tools for managing relationships with customers that go beyond demographics and customer service data collection. Relationship marketing extends to include inbound marketing, a combination of search optimization and strategic content, public relations, social media and application development.

== Development ==
Relationship marketing refers to an arrangement where both the buyer and seller have an interest in a more satisfying exchange. This approach aims to transcend the post-purchase-exchange process with a customer in order to make richer contact by providing a more personalised purchase, and using the experience to create stronger ties. A main focus on a long-term relationship with customers differentiates relationship marketing from other marketing techniques.

The term first appeared in the marketing literature in Berry's 1983 conference paper on services marketing, and Jackson (1985) extended the concept to business markets. Berry (1983) argued in a conference about the field of service marketing that relationship marketing is a marketing activity for enterprises to obtain, maintain and promote effective relationships with customers. After a long-term study on the marketing process of the service industry, it was concluded that the ultimate goal of enterprise marketing is not only to develop new customers but also to focus on maintaining existing customers. Ultimately, the goal is to improve the long-term interests of both parties through cooperative relationships. The study also argues that the cost of maintaining an old customer is far lower than the cost of developing a new customer and that maintaining a relationship with old consumers is more economical than developing new customers.

Jackson (1985) further modified the concept in the aspect of industry marketing. He argued that the essence of relationship marketing is to attract, establish and maintain a close relationship with enterprise customers. Furthermore, other studies have concluded that the essence of relationship marketing is the actual maintenance of existing customers, which creates long-term interest in a product. This research conclusion has been generally recognised since the original proposal for relationship marketing. The research scope, however, is limited to the relationship with old customers, easily ignoring the dynamic development of customers because long-term customers are developed from new customers. If an enterprise is restricted to the maintenance of existing customers, it is impossible for it to achieve any progress or compete in the market since it cannot attract long-term customers in the first place.

From a social anthropological perspective, relationship marketing theory and practice can be interpreted as commodity exchange that instrumentalises features of gift exchange. Marketers, consciously or intuitively, are recognizing reciprocity, a 'pre-modern' form of exchange, and have begun to use it.

Thus, relationship marketing revolves around gaining loyal customers. According to Liam Alvey, relationship marketing can be applied where there are competitive product alternatives for customers to choose from and an ongoing desire for that product. Research studying relationship marketing suggests that companies can do this through one of the three value strategies: best price, best product or best service. Hence companies can relay their relationship marketing message through value statements.

The practice of relationship marketing has been facilitated by several generations of customer relationship management software, which track and analyze each customer's preferences and activities. For example, an automobile manufacturer maintaining a database of when and how repeat customers buy their products, including data concerning their choices and purchase financing, can more efficiently develop one-to-one marketing offers and product benefits. Moreover, extensive use of such software is found in web applications. A consumer shopping profile can be built as a person shops online and is then used to compute his likely preferences. These curated and predicted offerings can then be presented to the customer through cross-sell, email recommendation and other channels.

Relationship marketing has also migrated back into direct mail. Marketers can use the technological capabilities of digital, toner-based printing presses to produce unique, personalised pieces for each recipient through variable data printing. They can personalise documents by information contained in their databases, including name, address, demographics, purchase history and dozens to hundreds of other variables. The result is a printed piece that reflects the individual needs and preferences of each recipient, increasing the relevance of the piece and increasing the response rate.

== Scope ==
Additionally, relationship marketing has been strongly influenced by reengineering. According to process reengineering theory, organizations should be structured according to complete tasks and processes rather than functions. Thus cross-function teams should be responsible for a whole process from beginning to end rather than having the work go from one functional department to another, whereas traditional marketing uses the functional (or 'silo') department approach where stages of production are handled by different departments. The legacy of traditional marketing can still be seen in the traditional four Ps of the marketing mix: pricing, product management, promotion, and placement. According to Gordon (1999), the marketing mix approach is too limited to provide a usable framework for assessing and developing customer relationships in many industries and should be replaced by the relationship marketing alternative model where the focus is on customers, relationships and interaction over time rather than markets and products.

In contrast, relationship marketing is cross-functional, organised around processes that involve all aspects of an organization. Some commentators prefer to call relationship marketing 'relationship management' because it involves much more than that which is included in normal marketing.

Because of its broad scope, relationship marketing can be effective in many contexts. As well as being relevant to 'for profit' businesses, research indicates that relationship marketing can be useful for organizations in the voluntary sector and in the public sector.

Martin Christopher, Adrian Payne and David Ballantyne at the Cranfield School of Management claim that relationship marketing has the potential to forge a synthesis between quality management, customer service management and marketing.

== Approaches ==
=== Satisfaction ===
Relationship marketing relies on the communication and acquisition of consumer requirements solely from existing customers in a mutually beneficial exchange usually involving permission for contact by the customer through an opt-in system. With particular relevance to customer satisfaction, the relative price and quality of goods and services produced or sold through a company alongside customer service generally determine the amount of sales relative to that of competing companies. Although groups targeted through relationship marketing may be large, accuracy of communication and overall relevance to the customer remains higher than that of direct marketing.

=== Retention ===
A principle of relationship marketing is the retention of customers in order to ensure repeated trade from preexisting customers by satisfying requirements above those of competing companies through a mutually beneficial relationship. This technique balances new customers and opportunities with current and existing customers to maximise profit and counteracts the leaky bucket theory of business, where new customers in older direct marketing-oriented businesses are gained at the expense of the loss of older customers. This process of 'churning' is less economically viable than retaining all or the majority of customers using both direct and relationship management because securing new customers requires more investment.

Many companies in competing markets redirect or allocate large amounts of resources towards customer retention. In markets with increasing competition, attracting new customers may cost up to five times more than retaining current customers because direct or 'offensive' marketing requires much more to cause defection from competitors. However, it is suggested that because extensive classic marketing theories center on means of attracting customers and creating transactions rather than maintaining them, the predominant usage of direct marketing used in the past is now gradually being used more with relationship marketing as the latter's importance becomes more recognizable.

Reichheld and Sasser (1990) claim that a 5% improvement in customer retention can cause an increase in profitability of between 25 and 85 percent in terms of net present value depending on the industry. However, Carrol and Reichheld dispute these calculations, claiming that they result from faulty cross-sectional analysis. Research by John Fleming and Jim Asplund indicates that engaged customers generate 1.7 times more revenue than normal customers while having engaged employees and engaged customers returns a revenue gain of 3.4 times the normal return.

According to Buchanan and Gilles, the increased profitability associated with customer retention efforts occurs because of several factors once a relationship has been established with a customer:

- The cost of acquisition occurs only at the beginning of a relationship. The longer a relationship, the lower the amortised cost.
- Account maintenance costs decline as a percentage of total costs or as a percentage of revenue.
- Long-term customers tend to be less inclined to switch products and also tend to be less price-sensitive. This can result in stable unit sales volume and increases in dollar-sales volume.
- They also may provide free word-of-mouth promotions and referrals.
- Furthermore, they are more likely to purchase ancillary products and high-profit margin supplemental products.
- Customers who stay with a company tend to be satisfied with the relationship and are less likely to switch to competitors, increasing the difficulty for competitors to enter the market or gain market share.
- Regular customers tend to be less expensive to service because they are familiar with the process, require less 'education' and are consistent in their order placement.
- Increased customer retention and loyalty makes employees' jobs easier and more satisfying. In turn, happy employees increase customer satisfaction in a virtuous circle.

The relationship ladder of customer loyalty groups types of customers according to their level of loyalty. The ladder's first rung consists of prospects, non-customers who are likely to become customers in the future. This is followed by the successive rungs of customer, client, supporter, advocate, and partner. The relationship marketer's objective is to 'help' customers climb the ladder as high up as possible. This usually involves providing more personalised service and providing service quality that exceeds expectations at each step.

Customer retention efforts involve multiple considerations:

1. Customer valuation – Gordon (1999) describes how to value customers and categorise them according to their financial and strategic value so that companies can decide where to invest for deeper relationships and which relationships need to be served differently or even terminated.
2. Customer retention measurement – Dawkins and Reichheld (1990) calculated a company's customer retention rate. This is the percentage of customers at the beginning of the year that are still customers by the end of the year. In accordance with this statistic, an increase in retention rate from 80% to 90% is associated with a doubling of the average life of a customer relationship from 5 to 10 years. This ratio can be used to make comparisons between products, between market segments, and over time.
3. Determining reasons for defection – It comprises investigating root causes, not mere symptoms. This involves probing for details when contacting former customers. Other techniques include the analysis of customers' complaints and competitive benchmarking (see competitor analysis).
4. Developing and implementing a corrective plan – This could involve actions to improve employee practices, using benchmarking to determine best corrective practices, visible endorsement of top management, adjustments to the company's reward and recognition systems, and the use of recovery teams to eliminate the causes of defections.

A technique to calculate the value to a firm of a sustained customer relationship has been developed. This calculation is typically called customer lifetime value, a prediction of the net profit of a customer's relationship with a company.

Retention strategies may also include building barriers to customer switching by product bundling (combining several products or services into one package and offering them at a single price), cross-selling (selling related products to current customers), cross-promotions (giving discounts or other promotional incentives to purchasers of related products), loyalty programs (giving incentives for frequent purchases), increasing switching costs (adding termination costs such as mortgage termination fees), and integrating computer systems of multiple organizations (primarily in industrial marketing).

Many relationship marketers use a team-based approach due to the concept that the more points of contact between the organization and customer, the stronger the bond and the more secure the relationship.

== Application ==
Relationship marketing and traditional or transactional marketing are not mutually exclusive, and there is no need for a conflict between them. In practice, a relationship-oriented marketer still has choices depending on the situation. Most firms blend the two approaches in order to reach a short-term marketing goal or long-term marketing strategy. Many products have a service component to them, which has been growing in recent decades.

Relationship marketing aims to strengthen the relationship with clients and secure them. Morgan and Hunt (1994) made a distinction between economic and social exchange on the basis of exchange theory and concluded that the basic guarantee of social exchange was the spirit of the contract of trust and commitment. The transition from economic exchange theory to social exchange theory is where the one-time transaction's prevalence is reduced.

Besides, the theoretical core of enterprise relationship marketing in this period is the cooperative relationship based on commitment, which defines relationship marketing from the perspective of exchange theory and emphasizes that relationship marketing is an activity related to the progress, maintenance and development of all marketing activities. The theory states that trading enterprises are composed of trust and commitment and that the basis of marketing activities to establish long-term relations. Factors affecting cooperation from both sides include communication, power, cost and benefit and opportunism behavior; but the relationship effect is mainly formed by trust and commitment. Moreover, Copulsky and Wolf (1990) introduced terminology like 'one to one' marketing that leverages IT to target customers with specific offers.

Enterprise has an incentive to improve the effect of relationships with customer. When access to data and information that improves the relationship with the customer has a low cost, enterprises pay the cost in order to improve relations with customers. Due to the development of communication and Internet technology, information costs have decreased substantially. Liker and Klamath (1998) introduced the relationship between enterprises and suppliers into the scope of relational marketing, claiming that in the marketing process manufacturers make suppliers assume corresponding responsibilities and enable them to exploit technological and resource advantages in the production process, improving their marketing innovation.

Lukas and Ferrell (2000) believe that the implementation of customer-oriented marketing can greatly promote marketing innovation and encourage enterprises to break through the traditional relationship model between enterprises and customers and propose new products. Lethe (2006) confirms the relationship between enterprises and customers through the observation of the benchmarking customer research, finding a positive correlation to innovation. He posits that good relations between enterprises and customers results in more efficient benchmarking, identifying new potential products, reduce the cost of new product development and increase market acceptance of products. Also he proposes that all relationships established with relevant parties for enterprise marketing are centered on the establishment of good customer relations: the core concept of relationship marketing is maintaining a relationship with customers.

Guinness (1994) propounds that relationship marketing is a consciousness that regards the marketing process as the interaction between enterprises and various aspects of relationships and networks. According to his research, enterprise faces four relations: its relationship with the macro-environment, that with the micro-environment, market relations and relations with a special market. In addition, enterprises in the implementation of relationship marketing are often able to use networks to promote all aspects of relationship coordination and progress.

=== Internal marketing ===
Relationship marketing stresses internal marketing, which is using a marketing orientation within an organization itself. Many relationship marketing attributes like collaboration, loyalty and trust determine internal customers' words and actions. According to this theory, every employee, team and department in the company is simultaneously a supplier and a customer of services and products. An employee obtains a service at a point in the value chain and then provides a service to another employee further along the value chain. If internal marketing is effective, every employee both provides and receives exceptional service to and from other employees. It also helps employees understand the significance of their roles and how their roles relate to others'. If implemented well, it can encourage every employee to see the process in terms of the customer's perception of value and the organization's strategic mission. Further, an effective internal marketing program is a prerequisite for effective external marketing efforts (W. George 1990).

=== Six markets model ===
Christopher, Payne and Ballantyne (1991) identify six markets which they note as central to relationship marketing: internal markets, supplier markets, recruitment markets, referral markets, influence markets and customer markets. They refer to Berry's work (1983), which drew attention to the need to engage with internal stakeholders such as employees to ensure that they are capable and willing to deliver the value proposition on offer.

Referral marketing is the development and implementation of a marketing plan in order to stimulate referrals. Marketing to suppliers is aimed at ensuring a long-term conflict-free relationship in which all parties understand the others' needs and exceed their expectations. Such a strategy can reduce costs and improve quality. Meanwhile, Influence markets involve a wide range of sub-markets, including government regulators, standards bodies, lobbyists, stockholders, bankers, venture capitalists, financial analysts, stockbrokers, consumer associations, environmental associations and labor associations. These activities are typically carried out by the public relations department, but relationship marketers believe that marketing to all six markets is the responsibility of everyone in an organization. Each market may require its own explicit strategies and marketing mix.

=== Live-in marketing ===
Live-in marketing (LIM) is a variant of marketing and advertising in which the target consumer is allowed to sample or use a product in a relaxed atmosphere over a long period of time. Much like product placement in film and television, LIM was developed as a means to reach select target demographics in a non-invasive and much less garish manner than traditional advertising. While LIM represents an entirely untapped avenue of marketing, it is not an entirely novel idea. With the rising popularity of experiential and event marketing in North America and Europe and the relatively high ROI in terms of advertising dollars spent on experiential marketing compared to traditional big media advertising, industry analysts see LIM as a natural progression.

LIM functions around the premise that marketing or advertising agencies aim to appeal to companies' target demographic. Avenues such as sponsorship or direct product placement and sampling are explored in turn. Unlike traditional event marketing, LIM suggests that end-users can sample the product or service in a comfortable and relaxed atmosphere. The theory posits that the end-user will have as positive as possible an interaction with the given brand, thereby leading to word-of-mouth communication and potential future purchases.

== See also ==
- Personalised marketing
- Customer relationship management

== Bibliography ==
- Dawkins, P. and Reichheld, F. (1990) "Customer Retention as a Competitive Weapon", Directors and Boards, vol 14, no 4, 1990
- George, W. (1990) "Internal marketing and organizational behavior: A partnership in developing customer-conscious employees at every level", Journal of Business Research, vol 20, no 1, 1990, pp 63–70
- Gillett, A. G. (2015). REMARKOR: RELATIONSHIP MARKETING ORIENTATION ON LOCAL GOVERNMENT PERFORMANCE. Journal of Services Research, 15(1), 97.
- Gillett, A.G. (2016). MULTIPLE RELATIONSHIPS WITH MULTIPLE STAKEHOLDERS: THE SCOPE OF RELATIONSHIP MARKETING FOR PUBLIC SERVICES. Journal of Services Research, 16(2), 1–28.
- Gummesson, E. (2011). Total relationship marketing. Routledge.
- Levitt, T. (1983) "After the Sale is Over", Harvard Business Review, Sept–Oct, 1983
- McKenna, R. (1991) "Marketing is Everything", Harvard Business Review, Jan–Feb, 1991, pp 65–70 (ebook)
- Schneider, B. (1980) "The Service Organization: Climate Is Crucial", Organizational Dynamics, vol 9, no 2, 1980, pp 52–65
- Christopher, M., Payne, A.F.T. and Ballantyne, D. (1991) "Relationship Marketing: Bringing Quality, Customer Service and Marketing
- Callum, K., (2017) "Nor Nor Marketing", vol 5 pp 66–75
- "Together", Oxford, Butterworth-Heinemann
- Jean Paul Wijers, Monica Bakker, Robert Collignon, Gerty Smit, Prof René Foqué (2019) "Managing Authentic Relationships", Amsterdam University Press ISBN 9789462988613
