= Karlstad University =

University in Karlstad, Sweden

- Karlstads universitet
- Motto: Sapere aude
- Type: Public
- Established: 1977; 49 years ago as college, 1999; 27 years ago as university
- Rector: Jerker Moodysson
- Academic staff: 830
- Administrative staff: 360
- Students: 18,000 (2023)
- Doctoral students: 270
- Location: Karlstad, Värmland, Sweden; 59°24′21″N 13°34′54″E
- Website: www.kau.se

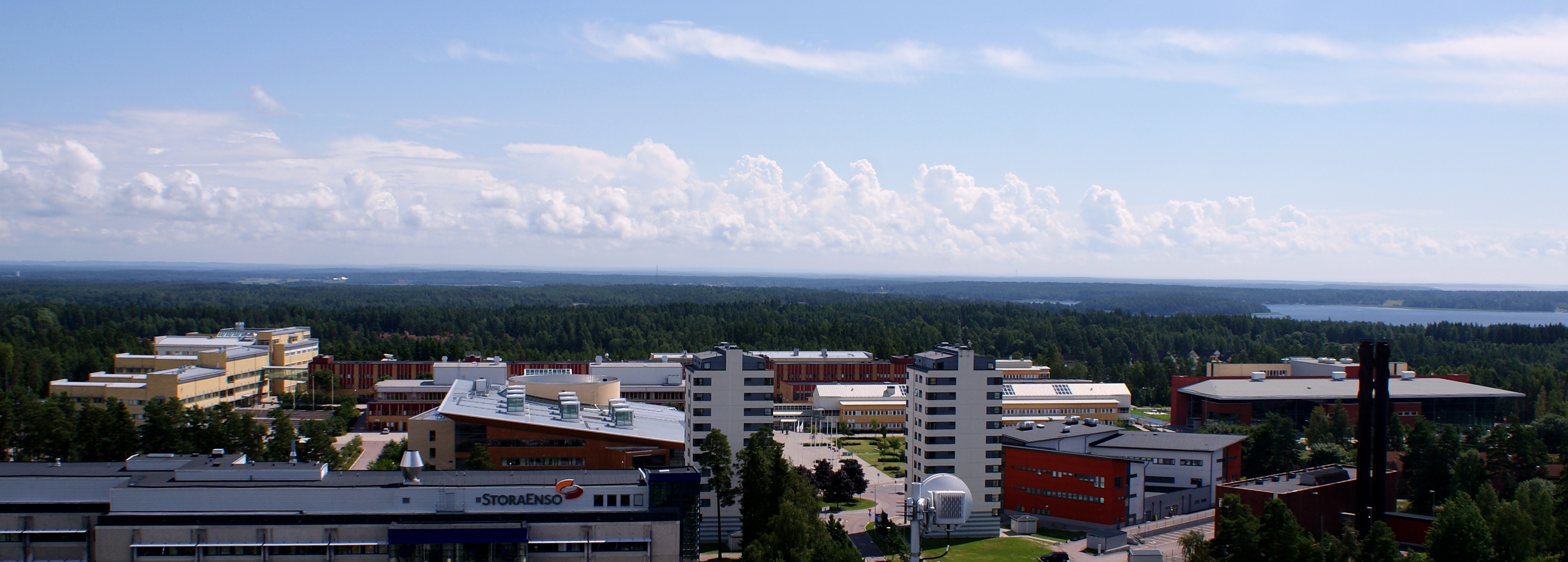
Karlstad University

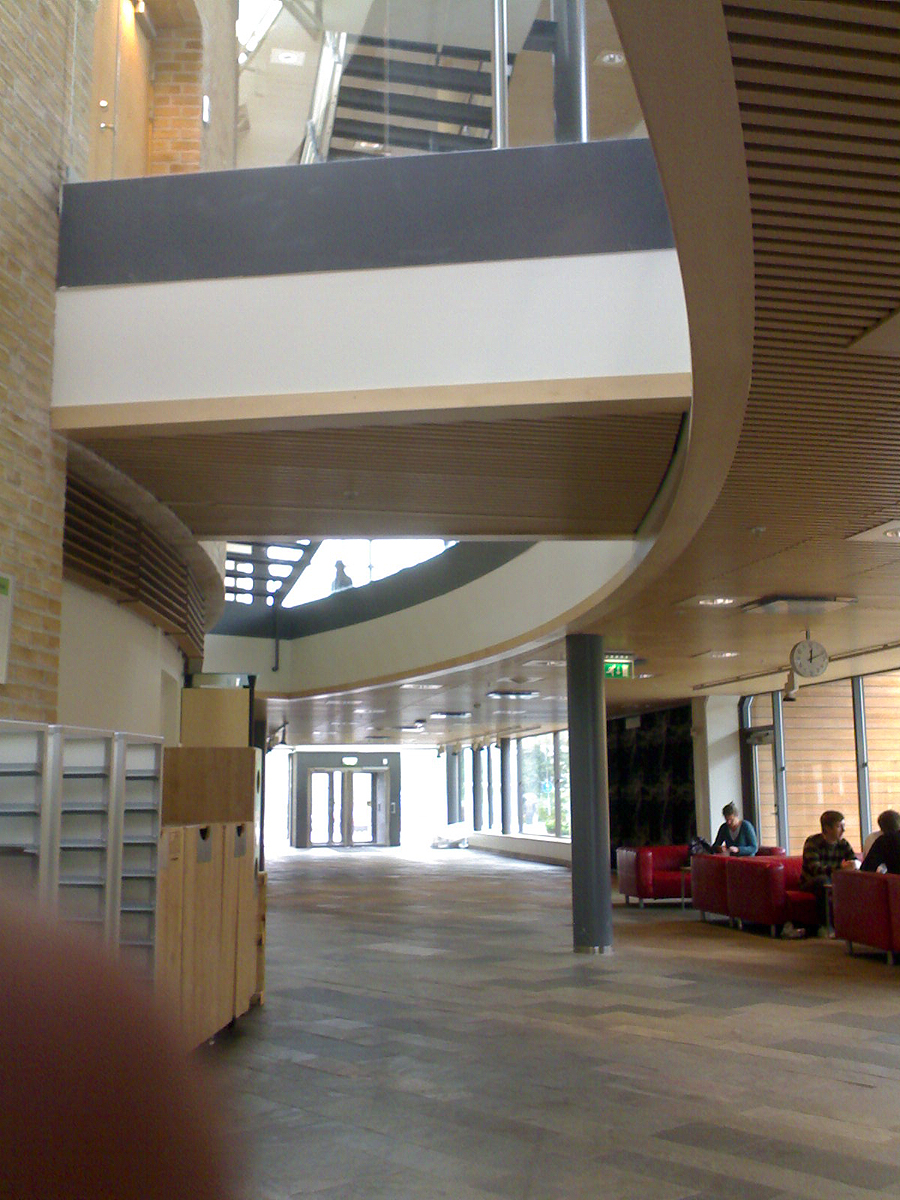
Karlstad University, entrance hall.

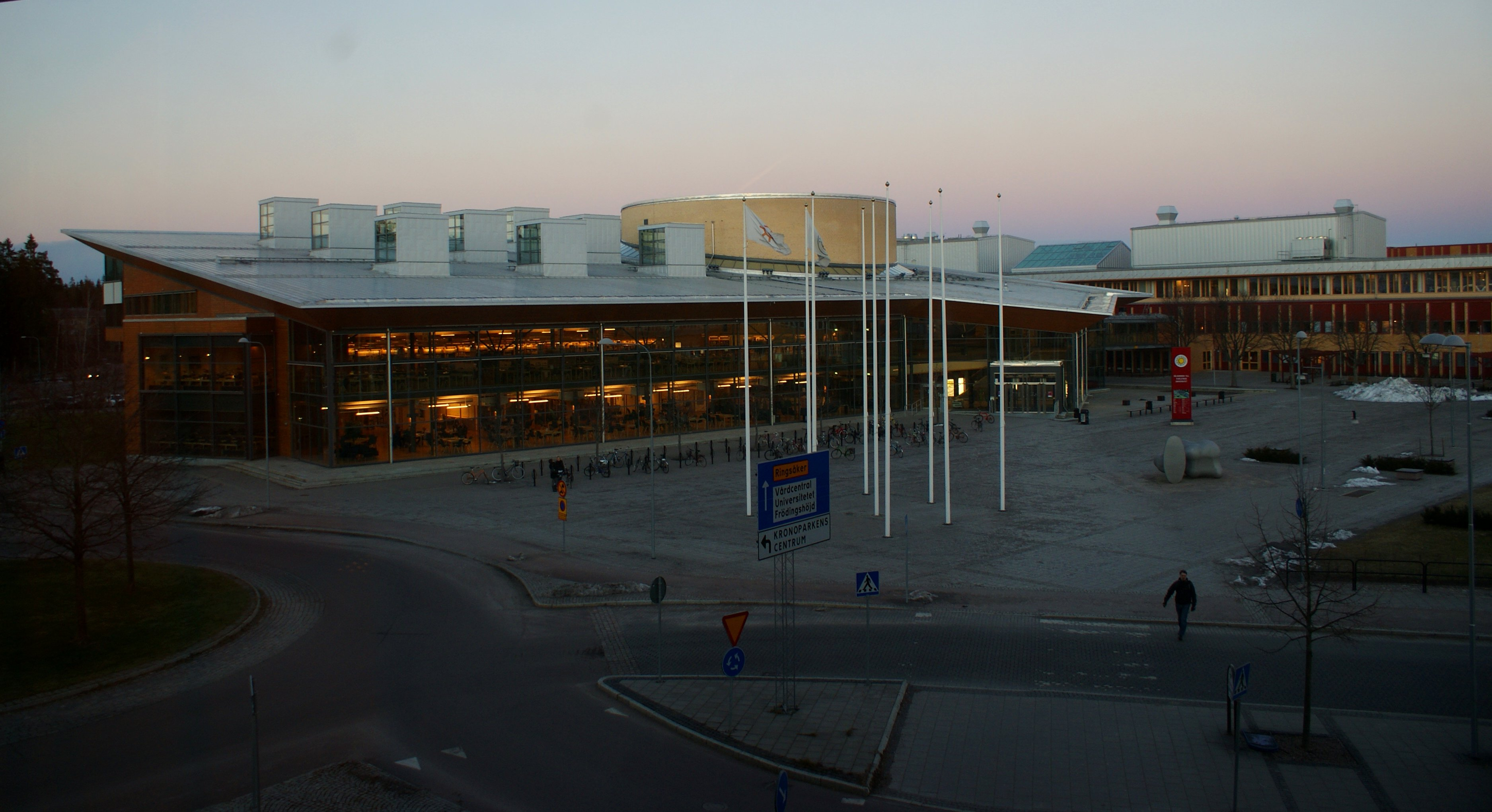
Karlstad University

Karlstad University (Swedish Karlstads universitet) is a state university in Karlstad, Sweden. It was originally established as the Karlstad campus of the University of Gothenburg in 1967, and this campus became an independent university college in 1977 which was granted full university status in 1999 by the Government of Sweden. The university has about 40 educational programmes, 30 programme extensions and 900 courses within humanities, social studies, science, technology, teaching, health care and arts. As of today, it has approximately 16,000 students and 1,200 employees. Its university press is named Karlstad University Press. The current Rector is Jerker Moodysson.

CTF Service Research Center (Swedish Centrum för tjänsteforskning) at Karlstad University is one of the world's leading research centers focusing on service management and value creation through service.

On March 26, 2009, the faculty of Economics, communication and IT formed Karlstad Business School (Swedish Handelshögskolan vid Karlstads universitet) as a brand of their educational programmes in the business related areas.

Karlstad University has two a cappella groups, Sällskapet CMB and Söt Likör. Many students live at the nearby student accommodation facilities called Unionen and Campus Futurum.

The motto of the university is Sapere aude (Dare to know).

== Organization ==
=== Faculty of Arts and Social Sciences ===
- Karlstad Business School:
  - Working Life Science, Business Administration, Information Systems, Law, Economics, Statistics
- Department of Artistic Studies:
  - Ingesund School of Music, Dance, Visual Art
- Department of Political, Historical, Religious and Cultural Studies:
  - History, Cultural Studies, Religious Studies, Social and Political Studies, Political Science
- Department of Social and Psychological Studies:
  - Gender Studies, Social Work, Psychology, Sociology
- Department of Language, Literature and Intercultural Studies:
  - English, Intercultural Studies, Comparative Literature, Spanish, Swedish as a Second Language, Swedish Language
- Department of Geography, Media and Communication:
  - Human Geography, Media and Communication Studies, Geography, Tourism Studies, Film Studies
- Department of Educational Studies:
  - Drama, Pedagogy, Pedagogical Work, Special needs Education
- Department of Administration

=== Faculty of Health, Science and Technology ===
- Department of Environmental and Life Sciences:
  - Biology, Environmental Science, Physical Geography, Risk Management
- Department of Health Sciences:
  - Biomedical Science, Public Health Science, Sports Sciences, Nursing, Oral Health
- Department of Engineering and Chemical Sciences:
  - Construction Engineering, Miljö- och energisystem, Chemistry, Chemical Engineering
- Department of Engineering and Physics:
  - Electrical Engineering, Physics, Mechanical Engineering, Materials Engineering
- Department of Mathematics and Computer Science:
  - Computer Science, Mathematics
- Department of Administration

=== Faculty Board for Teacher Education ===
Institutions of higher education issuing teaching degrees are obliged to have a board with responsibility for the teacher education programmes. The Faculty Board for Teacher Education is also responsible for educational research.

=== University Administration and Central Services ===
- Executive Office
- Human Resources Office
- Financial Office
- Student services Centre
- Communications and External Relations
- IT Department
- Janitorial Services
- Cleaning Services
- Printing Office
- University Library

=== Karlstad Business School ===
At Karlstad University there is a business school situated with focus on a service perspective. Karlstad Business School has seven disciplines and has a deep interest in economics and business. CTF Service Research Center conducts world leading research with a focus on value creation through service.

=== Ingesund School of Music ===
The Ingesund School of Music is part of Karlstad University and the Department of Artistic Studies. It is situated in the beautiful Arvika area in mid-Sweden. The school offers music teacher education, music studies, and sound engineering.

== Buildings ==
Karlstad University has a new and environmentally friendly way of heating and cooling the university's buildings. The initiative is one of the largest in a campus area in Europe, making Karlstad University almost self-sufficient for heat and cold.

With the new plant, Karlstad University will produce virtually all its heat and cooling locally. This will happen via 270 drilled holes, 200 meters down to the ground. And the environmental benefits are many, among other things, carbon dioxide emissions are radically reduced and energy consumption for heating and cooling buildings can fall by about 70 percent.

The investment means that the current district heating is replaced and that heat can instead be supplied by heat pump technology. During the summer, heat is stored in the ground and then taken up during the winter.

There is no other campus in Europe with a comprehensive geo-energy plant in this size, says Birgitta Hohlfält, Regional Director of Akademiska Hus Väst.

== Notable people ==
- Stefan Holm (b. 1976), retired Swedish high jumper, worked at Karlstad University.

== See also ==
- List of universities in Sweden
