= Hanken School of Economics =

Business school in Finland

- Svenska handelshögskolan
- Type: Public
- Established: 1909; 117 years ago
- Affiliations: EQUIS, AMBA, AACSB, PRME, EDAMBA, EIASM
- Rector: Ingmar Björkman
- Students: 2,500
- Location: Helsinki and Vaasa, Finland; 60°10′15″N 024°55′27″E
- Campus: Urban
- Language: Swedish, English
- Website: www.hanken.fi/en

Hanken School of Economics (Swedish: Svenska handelshögskolan, also known as Hanken) is a business school in Finland with two campuses, Helsinki and Vaasa. Founded in 1909, it is the oldest business school in Finland, and one of the oldest in the Nordic countries. Its programmes are offered in Swedish and English.

== History ==
Hanken was established in Helsinki on 1 September 1909, making it one of the oldest business schools in northern Europe, opening a month after the Stockholm School of Economics. The statutory meeting for Aktiebolaget Högre Svenska Handelsläroverket in Helsinki was held in December 1908, and only four months later the private community college under the name of Högre Svenska Handelsläroverket statutes were approved. In 1927, the school was given its current name, Svenska Handelshögskolan. The school introduced a bachelor's degree in economics in 1928, with professorships being introduced in 1934. The first doctoral dissertation took place in 1944.

Hanken's campus in Vaasa was established in 1980 aiming to develop business education in Ostrobothnia, a region with a large proportion of the Swedish-speaking population in Finland. In 2018, Hanken joined the Helsinki Graduate School of Economics, an initiative to bring together three Finnish universities – Aalto University, Hanken School of Economics, and the University of Helsinki.

== Rankings and accreditations ==
Hanken has received the so-called Triple Crown accreditation (assessments of quality insurance by the three largest business school accreditation organizations: AACSB, AMBA, and EQUIS). Hanken was first awarded the European Quality Improvement System accreditation (EQUIS) in 2000. The Association of MBAs accreditation (AMBA) was awarded in 2008. The Association to Advance Collegiate Schools of Business accreditation (AACSB) was awarded in 2015.

In 2024, Hanken secured the 57th position in the Financial Times Masters in Management ranking, placing among the top three business schools in the Nordics.

Hanken is a member and signatory of the Principles for Responsible Management Education (PRME) initiative, an initiative between the United Nations (UN) and business schools. Hanken is also a signatory of the San Francisco Declaration on Research Assessment (DORA), an initiative proposing a holistic assessment of scientist's contributions.

== Degrees and programmes ==
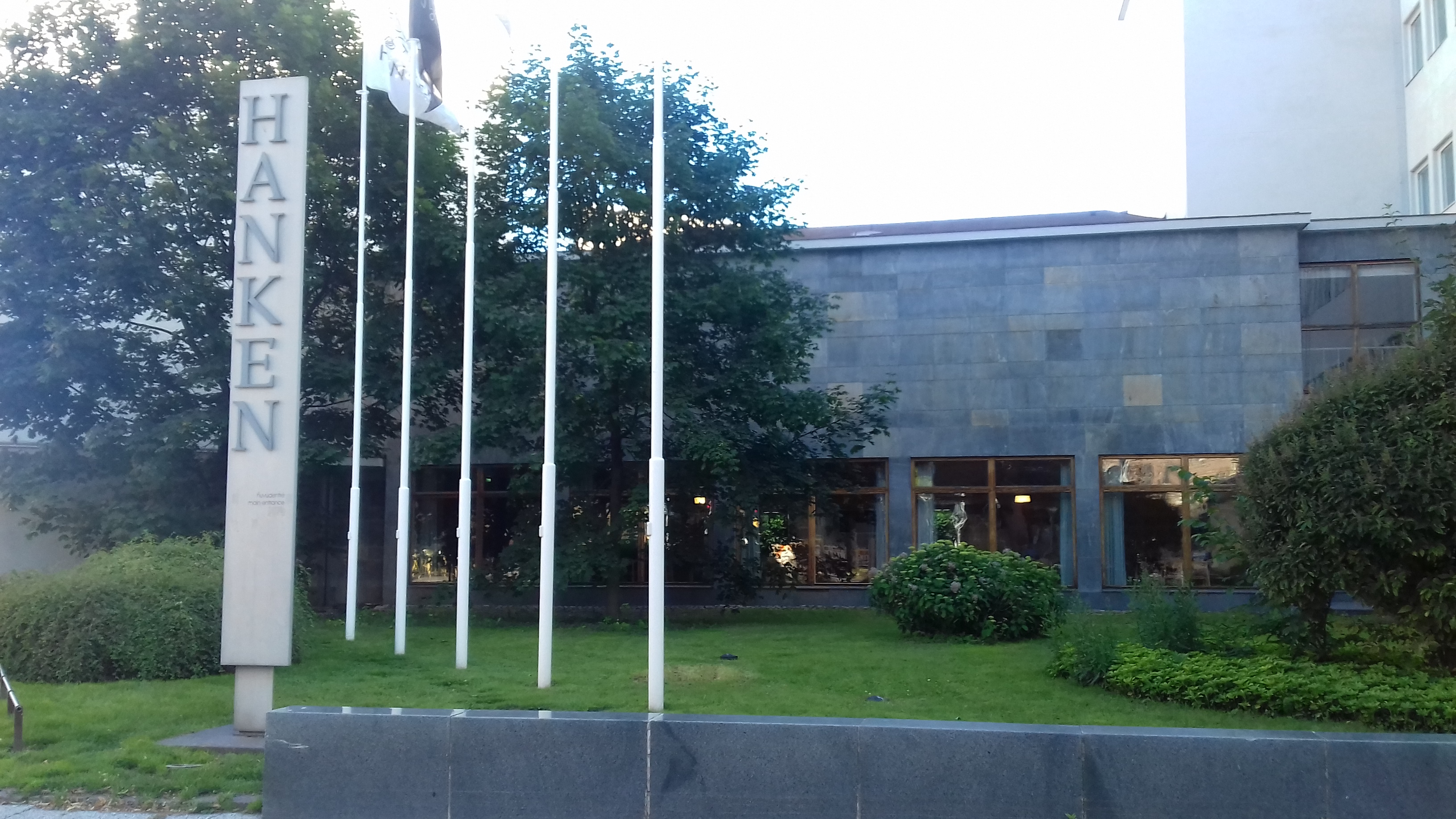
Hanken Helsinki

The school offers university degrees in economics, marketing, management and accountancy at the bachelor's, master's, and Ph.D. Master's degrees and Ph.D. programmes are offered in both Swedish and English languages, while the bachelor's degree programmes are in Swedish. The MSc in Economics and Business Administration programme is a two-year programme with 120 ECTS. The specialisations include Business and Management, Economics, Financial Analysis and Business Development, and Intellectual Property Law. In addition, Hanken & SSE Executive Education (a joint venture between Hanken and the Stockholm School of Economics in Sweden) offers an Executive MBA, a part-time two-year executive programme in English.

Hanken has approximately 120 partner universities for student exchange.

== Organization and administration ==
=== Governance ===
As for all universities in Finland, Hanken is regulated by the Universities Act (558/2009) and the Universities Decree (770/2009). The principal governance bodies of Hanken are the University Council, the Board, the Rector, and Deans.

The University Council appoints the external members of the Board, the auditors for the School, and the Academic Council. It approves the financial statement and grants the Board and the rector a discharge from liability.

The Board is the highest decision-making body of the School and is always chaired by an external person - at present Christoph Vitzthum is chair of the board. The Board decides on most issues of a strategic nature, such as the activity and economic plan as well as the budget. The Board is responsible for the economy of the School, the allocation of its funds, and appointing the Rector Ingmar Björkman. The student body is represented in each decision-making body by at least one student.

=== Departments ===
Hanken's research and teaching are organised into four departments and one centre for Languages and Business Communication. Students are represented in each Department Council by student-elected student representatives.

- Accounting and Commercial Law
- Finance and Economics
- Management and Organisation
- Marketing
- Centre for Languages and Business Communication

== Library ==
Hanken library is the library of Hanken School of Economics, serving staff, students and the general public. In Helsinki, the library is found in the main building of Hanken, while the book collection in Vaasa is found within the Vaasa City Library. Hanken library is a scientific library, not only open to students or staff at Hanken, but available to everyone carrying out studies or research in the field of economics and business administration.

The library services started already in 1909, when Hanken School of Economics was founded. The library's collection today is a hybrid of printed books and electronic resources, such as e-books, e-journals and databases with financial and company information. The library has a special collection on Finnish and foreign business companies' history.

Hanken library uses the open source library system Koha, and the library catalogue Hanna is part of the Finna-collaboration, through the National library of Finland.

== Research ==
=== Research and knowledge centres ===
Hanken hosts the following research centers.

- CERS – Centre for Relationship Marketing and Service Management
- CCR – Centre for Corporate Responsibility
- EPCE – Erling-Persson Centre for Entrepreneurship
- Hanken Centre for Accounting, Finance and Governance
- GODESS – The Research and Development Institute on Gender, Organisation, Diversity, Equality and Social Sustainability in Transnational Times
- HUMLOG Institute – The Humanitarian Logistics and Supply Chain Research Institute
- IPR – University Centre
- WCEFIR – Wallenberg Center for Financial Research

== Notable alumni ==
Hanken has over 15,000 alumni in 70 countries.

- Lenita Airisto – Author, former Miss Finland and fashion model
- Anne Berner – Business executive, board professional, and the former Minister of Transport and Communications
- Henrik Ehrnrooth – CEO of KONE
- Jannica Fagerholm – Finnish economist and business executive
- Christian Grönroos – Relationship marketing professor named as a Legend in Marketing.
- Carl Haglund – Former Minister of Defence
- Harry Harkimo – Businessman
- Kai Hietarinta – executive vice president of Neste, ice hockey executive
- Petri Kokko – Former figure skater
- Stefan Larsson – CEO of PVH Corporation
- Henrik Lax – Former member of the European Parliament
- Mikael Lilius – Former CEO of Fortum
- Elisabeth Rehn – Former MP of the Swedish People's Party and the first woman as the Minister of Defence in Finland
- Heidi Schauman – Economist
- Björn Wahlroos – Professor, banker, and chairman of several boards
- Hans Wind – Businessman and famous fighter pilot in World War II
- Christoph Vitzthum – President and CEO, Fazer Group

== Student Union ==
The Student Union of Hanken School of Economics (SHS) was founded in 1909 under the name of Kamratföreningen Niord. Today the student union has some 2,500 members and is the only student union to represent solely business students in Finland. The student union organises events and is responsible for student representation in the school's decision-making body. In accordance to law, all students at Hanken are automatically members of the student union.
