= Co-marketing =

Marketing strategy

Co-marketing (Commensal marketing, symbiotic marketing) is a form of marketing co-operation, in which two or more businesses work together.

"Co-marketing" began in 1981 when Koichi Shimizu, a professor at Josai University, published an article in a bulletin published by Nikkei Advertising Research Institute in Japan. Co-creation marketing and collaborative marketing are included within as part of Co-marketing.

== Commensal (symbiotic) marketing ==
Commensal (symbiotic) marketing is a marketing on which both corporation and a corporation, a corporation and a consumer, country and a country, human and nature coexist. The 7Cs Compass Model by Koichi Shimizu is a framework of Co-marketing (Commensal marketing or Symbiotic marketing).

The 7Cs Compass Model comprises:

- The key keywords in this model are commodity, security and weather.
- (C1) Corporation – The core of 4Cs is corporation (company and non profit organization). C-O-S (competitor, organization, stakeholder) within the corporation. The company has to think of compliance and accountability as important. The competition in the areas in which the company competes with other firms in its industry.

The four elements of the 7Cs Compass Model

- A formal approach to this harmonious coexistence with the earth and sustainable marketing mix is known as Four Cs (Commodity, Cost, Communication), Channel in "7Cs Compass Model. The four Cs Model provides a demand/customer co-creation alternative to the well-known four Ps supply side model (product, price, promotion, place) of marketing management:
    - Product → Commodity
    - Price → Cost
    - Promotion → Communication
    - Place → Channel
- (C2)Commodity – (Original meaning of Latin: Commodus= both convenient and happy) : Co-creation goods and services created by corporations and consumers together. Product out is useless. It is no good to buy it because we made it.
- (C3)Cost – (Original meaning of Latin: Constare= It makes sacrifices together ) : producing cost, selling cost, purchasing cost and Costs for society and the global environment.
- (C4)Communication – (Original meaning of Latin: Communio=sharing of meaning) : marketing communication: IMC, advertising, sales promotion, public relations, publicity, corporate identity etc.
- (C5)Channel – (Original meaning is a Canal): Marketing channels. Fusion of real and internet.
- (C6) Consumer – (Needle of compass to consumer)

The factors related to consumers can be explained by the first character of four directions marked on the compass model. These can be remembered by the cardinal directions, hence the name compass model:

  - N = Needs
  - S = Security
  - E = Education: (consumer education)
  - W = Wants
- (C7)Circumstances – (Needle of compass to Circumstances )

In addition to the consumer, there are various uncontrollable external environmental factors encircling the companies. Here it can also be explained by the first character of the four directions marked on the compass model:

  - N = National and International: Political, legal and ethical environment
  - S = Social and Cultural
  - E = Economic
  - W = Weather: Extreme weather, climate change and disasters.

== Co-creation marketing ==
The co-creation of a company and consumers are contained in the co-marketing. Co-creation is a management initiative, or form of economic strategy, that brings different parties together (for instance, a company and a group of customers), in order to jointly produce a mutually valued outcome.

== Collaborative marketing ==
Collaborative marketing is a marketing practice where two companies cooperate with separate distribution channels, sometimes including profit sharing. It is frequently confused with co-promotion.

== See also ==
- Advertising
- Co-creation
- Marketing
- Marketing mix
