= Devthon =

A devthon is a process that blends the principles of design thinking, co-creation, and rapid prototyping into a seamless unified method to trigger innovation. At the core of it is an event format that brings an interdisciplinary collaborative model to solve challenges and prototype new experiences. A devthon is generally focused on an "area of innovation" such as healthcare or rural livelihood. Participants go through different phases like immersion, ideation, design, and prototyping (hacking), leading to a demonstrable proof of concept.

The process differs from to a hackathon due to its emphasis on immersion, discovery, and design. Devthons are also not time-constrained like a hackathon, and can run for a few weeks.

== History ==
Devthons were started in 2014 by three entrepreneurs, Harish Krishnan and Prashant Venkatasubban. The different thematic areas that devthons have been organized include safety and security of communities, healthcare, rural livelihood, and smart cities. The largest-ever devthon was organized during Bioasia Conference 2015.
