= Mogreet =

Multimedia marketing company

Mogreet was a startup company that had developed a platform that delivered short videos, photos, audio, extended and Hispanic character text to consumers' mobile phones using SMS or MMS (texting) technology. Marketers either sent the multimedia message to a list of previously 'opted in' mobile phone numbers, or consumers could have send in a 'text-to-shortcode' SMS to receive the message(s).

The company initially developed its technology platform intending to use it to deliver video greeting cards to mobile phones, but was later focused on providing the service to marketers. Clients included Pretty Little Liars, Glee, Entravision Communications, Fox Searchlight Pictures, Paramount, and Reebok's Speedwick apparel brand.

On March 19, 2013, the company launched a SaaS platform led by Jack Ukropina called Mogreet Express, enabling small and medium-sized businesses to use SMS and MMS in their marketing mix.

The company was founded in 2006 and was based in Venice (metro Los Angeles), California. Investors included Ascend Ventures, Black Diamond Ventures, Draper Fisher Jurvetson Frontier, and Spyglass Ventures.

It went defunct in 2016.
