= Marketing co-operation =

A marketing co-operation or marketing cooperation is a partnership of at least two companies on the value chain level of marketing with the objective to tap the full potential of a market by bundling specific competences or resources. Other terms for marketing co-operation are marketing alliance, marketing partnership, co-marketing, and cross-marketing. Sometimes, called as Consortium as well.

Marketing co-operations are sensible when the marketing goals of two companies can be combined with a concrete performance measure for the end consumer. Successful marketing co-operations generate “win-win-win” situations that offer value not only to both partnering companies but also to their customers.

Marketing co-operations extend the perspective of marketing. While marketing measures deal with the optimal organization of the relationship between a company and its existing and potential customers, marketing co-operations audit to what extent the integration of a partner can contribute to improving the relationship between companies and customers.

In recent years, marketing co-operations have been increasingly popular between brands and entertainment properties. This usually involves a minimum exchange of name and image rights on behalf of a film studio for a specified advertising commitment from the partnering brand.

== Importance ==
The importance of marketing co-operations has significantly increased over the last few years: Companies recognize partnerships as an effective means for untapping growth potentials they cannot realize on their own. In the big merger and acquisition wave at the end of the nineties it became apparent, that co-operations (especially on the value chain level of marketing) often present a much more flexible approach with a more immediate growth impact than merging or acquiring entire business entities.

Studies show, that companies recognise the increasing relevance and potential of co-operations.

== Objectives ==
There are five main objectives of marketing co-operations:

- Build-up and/or strengthening of brand/image/traffic by implementing joint or exchange communication measures
- Access to new markets/customers by directly addressing the co-operation partner’s customers or by using its distribution points
- Increase of customer loyalty by addressing own customers with value added offerings from the partner - often useful for community building
- Reduction of marketing costs by bundling or exchanging marketing measures
- Measure the potential value of an intangible asset through how much consumers are willing to pay the premium

3M's corporate site describes the value they see in Joint Marketing:

Joint marketing refers to a situation where a product is manufactured by one company and distributed by another company. Both parties invest in commercialization efforts. Joint marketing differs from a joint venture in that it deals with commercialization and marketing dollars, rather than equity. The prominence of each logo generally is relative to its use as a primary or secondary contributor. Joint marketing differs from third-party relationships because both brands are present in the product itself. Normally, third-party relationships have both brands on literature and sales materials, but only the manufacturer is present on the product.

== Forms ==
Marketing co-operations can take on many different forms, for instance:

- Joint product development or Co-branding
- Joint communication or “Co-advertising“
- Joint sales measures or Co-promotion
- Co-marketing
- Cross media
- Product bundling
- Sponsoring
- Branded entertainment
- Product placement
- Music-brand partnerships
- Sales partnerships
- Licensing

== Examples ==
Examples of marketing co-operations include:

- Apple Inc. and Nike Inc. have formed a long term partnership to jointly develop and sell “Nike+iPod” products. The "Nike + iPod Sport Kit" links Nike+ products with Apple's MP3-Player iPod nano, so that performance data such as distance, pace, or burned calories can be displayed on the MP3-Player’s interface.
- The South Korean manufacturer of electronics products LG Electronics has teamed up with the luxury brand Prada in order to better tap the potential of the growing mobile phone high-end market by creating a Prada branded phone, the “Prada phone by LG”.
- Opel and Mango have established a pan-European marketing cooperation around the Tigra TwinTop campaign "Every street is a catwalk" with a focus on communication. This cooperation includes joint marketing communication, events/PR, and promotional activities.
- YouTube and NBA have joined forces to develop a special NBA Channel on the video platform, which is an individualised microsite providing primarily NBA material and offering user recordings of NBA games/players.
- NAPA Auto Parts sponsors the Napa Parts 200. Through this sponsorship, Napa Auto Parts validates to NASCAR fans that Napa Auto Parts is the place to go for quality auto parts. NASCAR gets promoted by Napa Auto Parts. Napa's competitor, Kragen also sponsors NASCAR in the form of the Winternationals
- Banner and link exchanges

Examples of entertainment based marketing co-operations include:

- Omega partnered with the James Bond franchise to help promote their watches; Daniel Craig appeared in advertisements.
- The SMC Group worked with Alexandra Burke and Unilever on the company's Sure Deodorant Campaign. This was done during her album cycle, helping to promote album sales as well as Unilever's product.
