= Four Cs =

Four Cs may refer to:

- Four Cs (education), a group of learning competencies and skills in 21st century learning
- Diamond (gemstone), the Four Cs are carat, cut, color, and clarity
- Marketing mix, may refer to two possible marketing-related concepts:
  - Four 'C's in 7Cs compass model (Co-marketing)
  - Four 'C's in consumer-oriented model
