= Rindfleisch =

Rindfleisch is a German surname. Literally meaning 'beef' in German, it may be derived from the occupation of butcher or from the nickname for a person whose favorite food is beef. Notable people with the surname include:

- Aric Rindfleisch, American marketing author
- Eduard von Rindfleisch (1836–1908), German pathologist and histologist
- Jan Rindfleisch, American art curator

== See also ==
- Boels von Rindtfleisch, The leader of the medieval Rintfleisch massacres
