= Product category volume =

In marketing, product category volume (PCV) is the weighted measure of distribution based on store sales within the product category. PCV is a refinement of all commodity volume (ACV). It examines the share of the relevant product category sold by stores in which a given product has gained distribution.

== Overview ==
Distribution metrics quantify the availability of products sold through retailers, usually as a percentage of all potential outlets. Often, outlets are weighted by their share of category sales or “all commodity” sales. For marketers who sell through resellers, distribution metrics reveal a brand's percentage of market access. Balancing a firm's efforts in “push” (building and maintaining reseller and distribution support) and “pull” (generating customer demand) is an ongoing strategic concern for marketers.

== Purpose ==
Product category volume measures a firm's ability to convey a product to its customers in terms of total category sales among outlets carrying the brand. It helps marketers understand whether a given product is gaining distribution in outlets where customers look for its category, as opposed to simply high-traffic stores where the product may get lost in the aisles.

When detailed sales data are available, PCV can provide a strong indication of the market share within a category to which a given brand has access. If sales data are not available, marketers can calculate an approximate PCV by using square footage devoted to the relevant category as an indication of the importance of that category to a particular outlet or store type.

== Calculation ==
Product category volume (PCV) is the percentage share (or dollar value) of category sales made by stores that stock at least one SKU of the brand in question, in comparison with all stores in their universe.

Product Category Volume (PCV) Distribution (%) =
100 x Total Category Sales of Outlets Carrying Brand ($) ÷
Total Category Sales of All Outlets ($)

Product Category Volume (PCV) Distribution ($) =
Total Category Sales of Outlets Carrying Brand ($)

== See also ==
- Numeric distribution
- All commodity volume
- Category performance ratio
