= Distribution (marketing) =

Making products available to customers

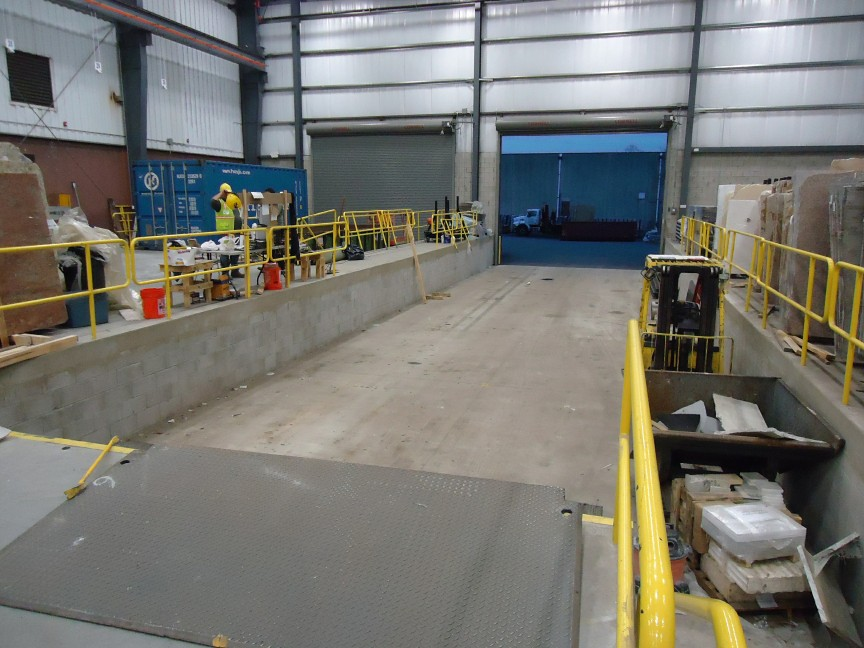
Warehouse storing granite in South Jersey, a U.S. East Coast epicenter for logistics and warehouse construction and distribution to a market to the Philadelphia metropolitan area and beyond

Distribution is the process of making a product or service available for the consumer or business user who needs it, and a distributor is a business involved in the distribution stage of the value chain. Distribution can be done directly by the producer or service provider or by using indirect channels with distributors or intermediaries. Distribution (or place) is one of the four elements of the marketing mix: the other three elements being product, pricing, and promotion.

Decisions about distribution need to be taken in line with a company's overall strategic vision and mission. Developing a coherent distribution plan is a central component of strategic planning. At the strategic level, as well as deciding whether to distribute directly or via a distribution network, there are three broad approaches to distribution, namely mass, selective and exclusive distribution. The number and type of intermediaries selected largely depends on the strategic approach. The overall distribution channel should also add value to the consumer overall.

== Definition ==
Distribution is fundamentally concerned with ensuring that products reach target customers in the most direct and cost-efficient manner. In the case of services, distribution is principally concerned with access. Although distribution, as a concept, is relatively simple, in practice Distribution management may involve a diverse range of activities and disciplines including detailed logistics, transportation, warehousing, storage, inventory management as well as channel management, including selection of channel members and rewarding distributors.

== Strategies ==
Before designing a distribution system, the supplier needs to determine what distribution channel to achieve in broad terms. The approach to distributing products or services depends on a number of factors including the type of product, especially perishability; the market served; the geographic scope of operations and the firm's overall mission and vision. The process of setting out a broad statement of the aims and objectives of a distribution channel is a strategic level decision.

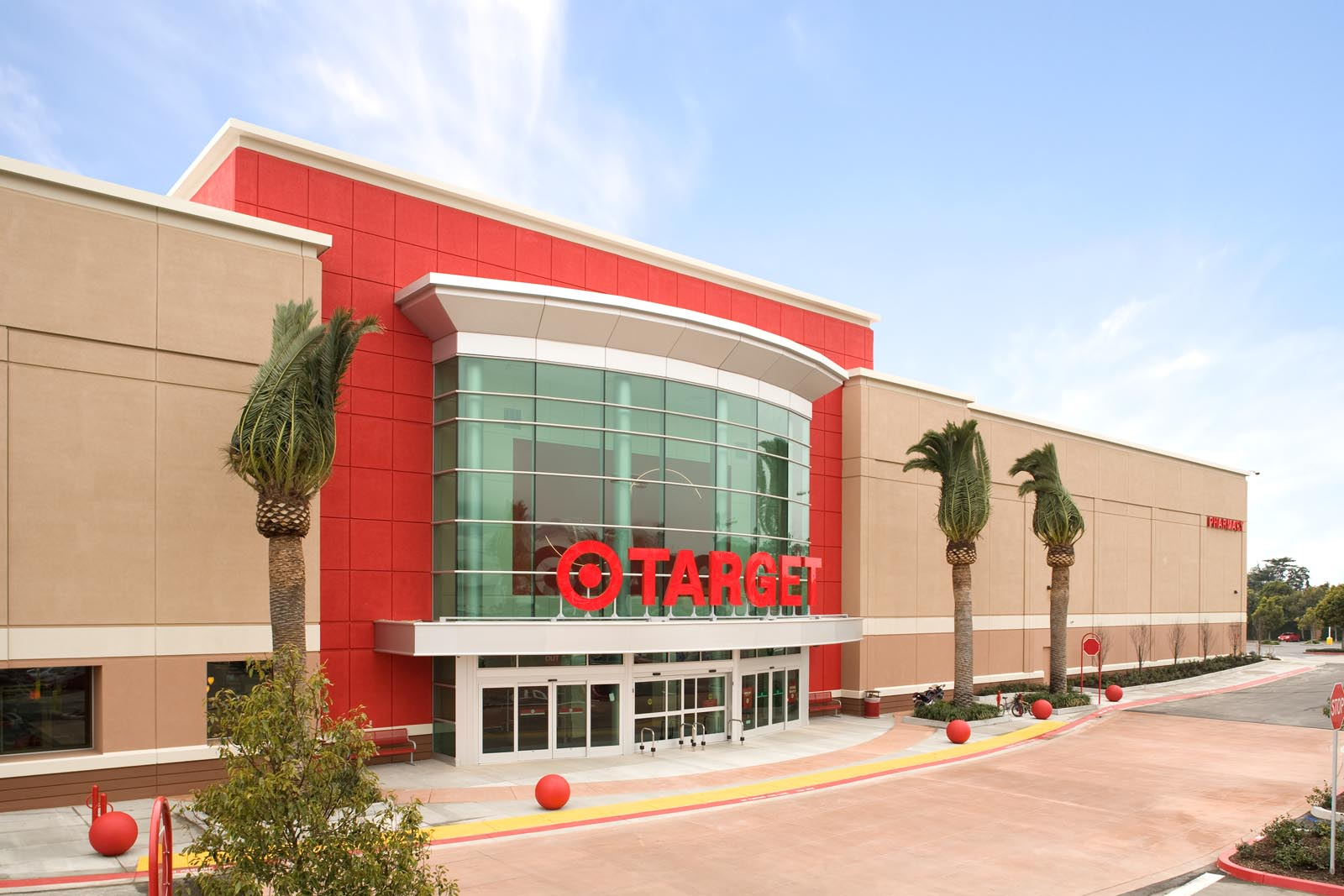
In an intensive distribution approach, the marketer relies on chain stores to reach broad markets in a cost efficient manner.

Strategically, there are three approaches to distribution:

- Mass distribution (also known as an intensive distribution): When products are destined for a mass market, the marketer will seek out intermediaries that appeal to a broad market base. For example, snack foods and drinks are sold via a wide variety of outlets including supermarkets, convenience stores, vending machines, cafeterias and others. The choice of distribution outlet is skewed toward those that can deliver to mass markets in a cost efficient manner.
- Selective distribution: A manufacturer may choose to restrict the number of outlets handling a product. For example, a manufacturer of premium electrical goods may choose to deal with department stores and independent outlets that can provide added value service level required to support the product. Dr. Scholl's orthopedic sandals, for example, only sell their product through pharmacies because this type of intermediary supports the desired therapeutic positioning of the product. Some of the prestige brands of cosmetics and skincare, such as Estee Lauder, Jurlique and Clinique, insist that sales staff are trained to use the product range. The manufacturer will only allow trained clinicians to sell their products.
- Exclusive distribution: In an exclusive distribution approach, a manufacturer chooses to deal with one intermediary or one type of intermediary. The advantage of an exclusive approach is that the manufacturer retains greater control over the distribution process. In exclusive arrangements, the distributor is expected to work closely with the manufacturer and add value to the product through service level, after sales care or client support services. Another definition of exclusive arrangement is an agreement between a supplier and a retailer granting the retailer exclusive rights within a specific geographic area to carry the supplier's product.

Summary of strategic approaches to distribution

Approach	Definition
Intensive distribution	The producer's products are stocked in the majority of outlets. This strategy is common for mass-produced products such as basic supplies, snack foods, magazines and soft drink beverages.
Selective distribution	The producer relies on a few intermediaries to carry their product. This strategy is commonly observed for more specialised goods that are carried through specialist dealers, for example, brands of craft tools, or large appliances.
Exclusive distribution	The producer selects only very few intermediaries. Exclusive distribution occurs where the seller agrees to allow a single retailer the right to sell the manufacturer's products. This strategy is typical of luxury goods retailers such as Gucci.

=== Push vs pull ===
In consumer markets, another key strategic level decision is whether to use a push or pull strategy. In a push strategy, the marketer uses intensive advertising and incentives aimed at distributors, especially retailers and wholesalers, with the expectation that they will stock the product or brand, and that consumers will purchase it when they see it in stores. In contrast, in a pull strategy, the marketer promotes the product directly to consumers hoping that they will pressure retailers to stock the product or brand, thereby pulling it through the distribution channel. The choice of a push or pull strategy has important implications for advertising and promotion. In a push strategy, the promotional mix would consist of trade advertising and sales calls while the advertising media would normally be weighted toward trade magazines, exhibitions, and trade shows while a pull strategy would make more extensive use of consumer advertising and sales promotions while the media mix would be weighted toward mass-market media such as newspapers, magazines, television, and radio.

== Channels and intermediaries ==
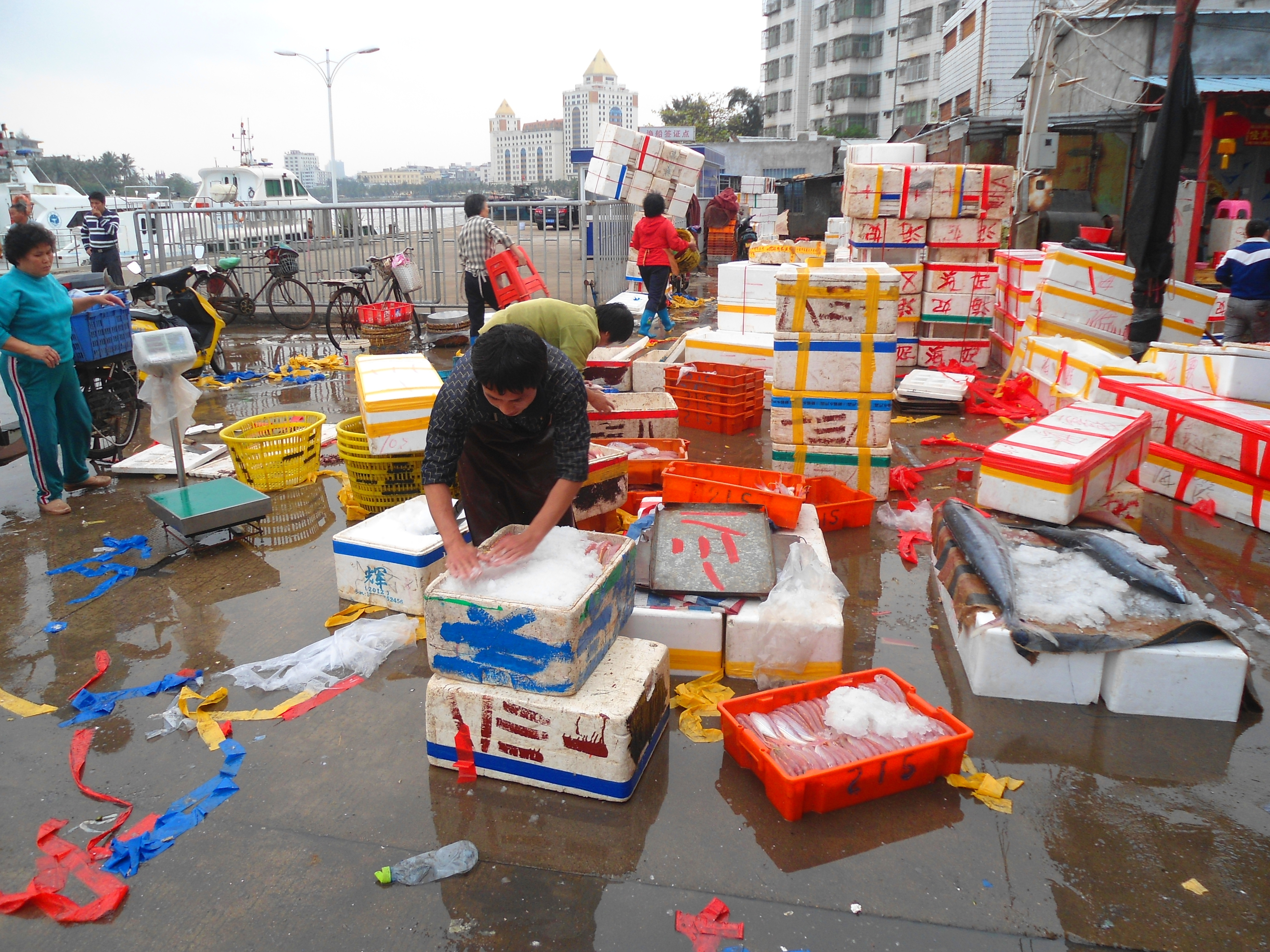
A wholesale fish market at Haikou New Port, China

Distribution of products takes place through a marketing channel, also known as a distribution channel. A marketing channel is the people, organizations, and activities necessary to transfer the ownership of goods from the point of production to the point of consumption. It is the way products get to the end-user, the consumer. This is mostly accomplished through merchant retailers or wholesalers or, in the international context, by importers. In certain specialist markets, agents or brokers may become involved in the marketing channel: for example in the insurance sector, the European Union has noted that "insurance and reinsurance intermediaries play a central role in the distribution of insurance and reinsurance products" . The EU introduced the Insurance Distribution Directive in 2016 to enhance a level of harmonisation in this market across EU member states.

Typical intermediaries involved in distribution include:

- Wholesaler: A merchant intermediary who sells chiefly to retailers, other merchants, or industrial, institutional, and commercial users mainly for resale or business use. The transactions are B2B (Business to Business). Wholesalers typically sell in large quantities. (Wholesalers, by definition, do not deal directly with the public).
- Retailer: A merchant intermediary who sells direct to the public. There are many different types of retail outlet - from hypermarts and supermarkets to small, independent stores. The transactions in this case are B2C (Business to Customer).
- Agent: An intermediary who is authorized to act for a principal in order to facilitate exchange. Unlike merchant wholesalers and retailers, agents do not take title to goods, but simply put buyers and sellers together. Agents are typically paid via commissions by the principal. For example, travel agents are paid a commission of around 15% for each booking made with an airline or hotel operator.
- Jobber: A special type of wholesaler, typically one who operates on a small scale and sells only to retailers or institutions. For example, rack jobbers are small independent wholesalers who operate from a truck, supplying convenience stores with snack foods and drinks on a regular basis.

== Channel design ==
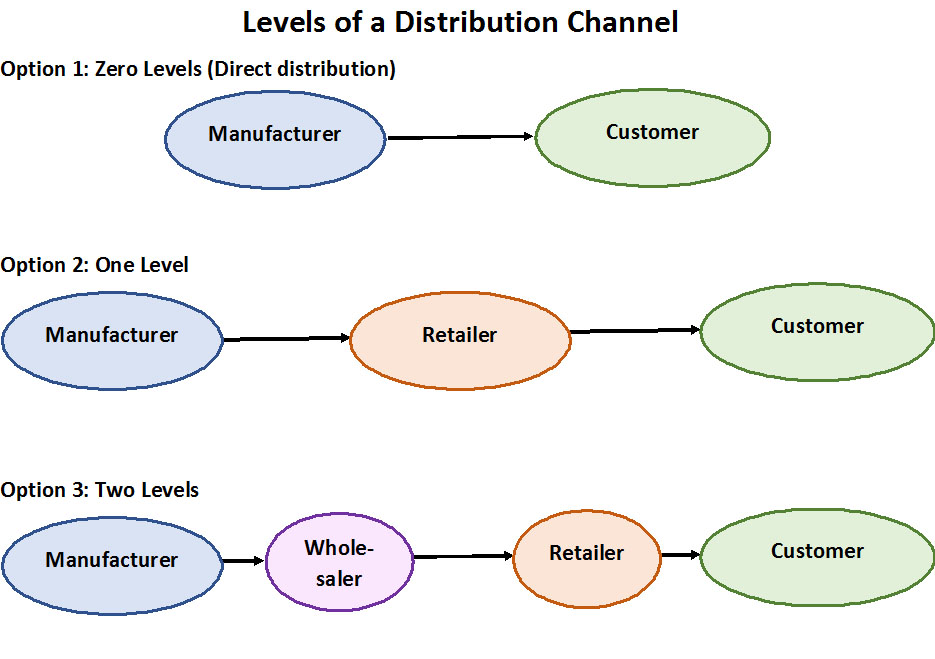
Types of distribution systems

A firm can design any number of channels they require to reach customers efficiently and effectively. Channels can be distinguished by the number of intermediaries between producer and consumer. If there are no intermediaries then this is known as a zero-level distribution system or direct marketing. A level one (sometimes called one-tier) channel has a single intermediary. A level two (alternatively a two-tier) channel has two intermediaries, and so on. This flow is typically represented as being manufacturer to retailer to consumer, but may involve other types of intermediaries. In practice, distribution systems for perishable goods tend to be shorter - direct or single intermediary, because of the need to reduce the time a product spends in transit or in storage. In other cases, distribution systems can become quite complex involving many levels and different types of intermediaries.

== Channel mix ==
In practice, many organizations use a mix of different channels; a direct sales force may call on larger customers. This may be complemented with other agents to cover smaller customers and prospects. When a single organization uses a variety of different channels to reach its markets, this is known as a multi-channel distribution network. In addition, online retailing or e-commerce is leading to disintermediation, the removal of intermediaries from a supply chain. Retailing via smartphone or m-commerce is also a growth area.

== Channel management ==
The firm's marketing department needs to design the most suitable channels for the firm's products, then select appropriate channel members or intermediaries. An organization may need to train staff of intermediaries and motivate the intermediary to sell the firm's products. The firm should monitor the channel's performance over time and modify the channel to enhance performance.

=== Motivation ===
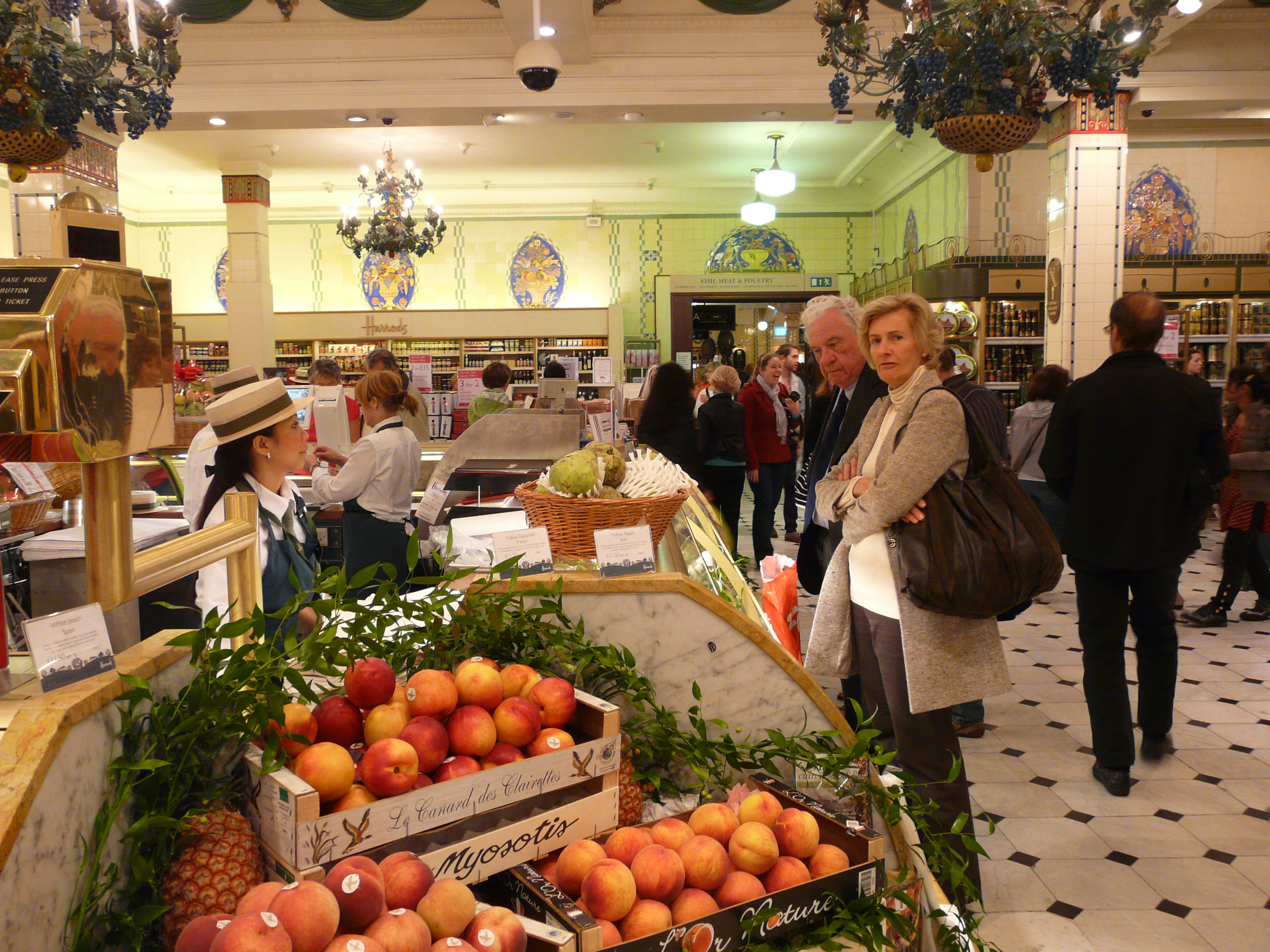
Harrods' food hall, a major retailer in London

To motivate intermediaries the firm can use positive actions, such as offering higher margins to the intermediary, special deals, premiums and allowances for advertising or display. On the other hand, negative actions may be necessary, such as threatening to cut back on margin, or hold back delivery of product. Care must be exercised when considering negative actions as these may fall foul of regulations and can contribute to a public backlash and a public relations disaster. Manufacturer complacency has been highlighted as a risk leading distributors to move their business to other supply lines.

=== Conflict ===
Channel conflict can arise when one intermediary's actions prevent another intermediary from achieving their objectives. Vertical channel conflict occurs between the levels within a channel, and horizontal channel conflict occurs between intermediaries at the same level within a channel. Channel conflict is a perennial problem. There are risks that a powerful channel member may coordinate the interests of the channel for personal gain. Territories are often seen as a source of conflict, sometimes because boundaries are only loosely defined.

== Trends ==
=== Distributor development ===
American building materials supplier Johns Manville noted in the years before the US entered World War II that distributors needed support in a range of practical areas if they were going to be successful in connecting with housing developers, and instituted "Housing Guilds" which brought together the distributor (as the materials supplier), design services, sub-contractors, local realtors and housing financiers. Laurence C. Hart refers to the extensive development of these guilds and the "Training Schools" which they operated, converting these into a radio-based program from 1942. Hart, who worked for the supplier, put this experience forward to the American Marketing Association as "an outstanding example of manufacturer-distributor collaboration on an industry-wide basis".

Companies wishing to grow through sales to new markets may need to identify and develop relationships with local distributors, for example to support export to new markets. In southeast Asia, for example, many distributors have a head office in Singapore which can be used by manufacturers outside the region to increase their regional market penetration and grow sales.

=== Channel switching ===
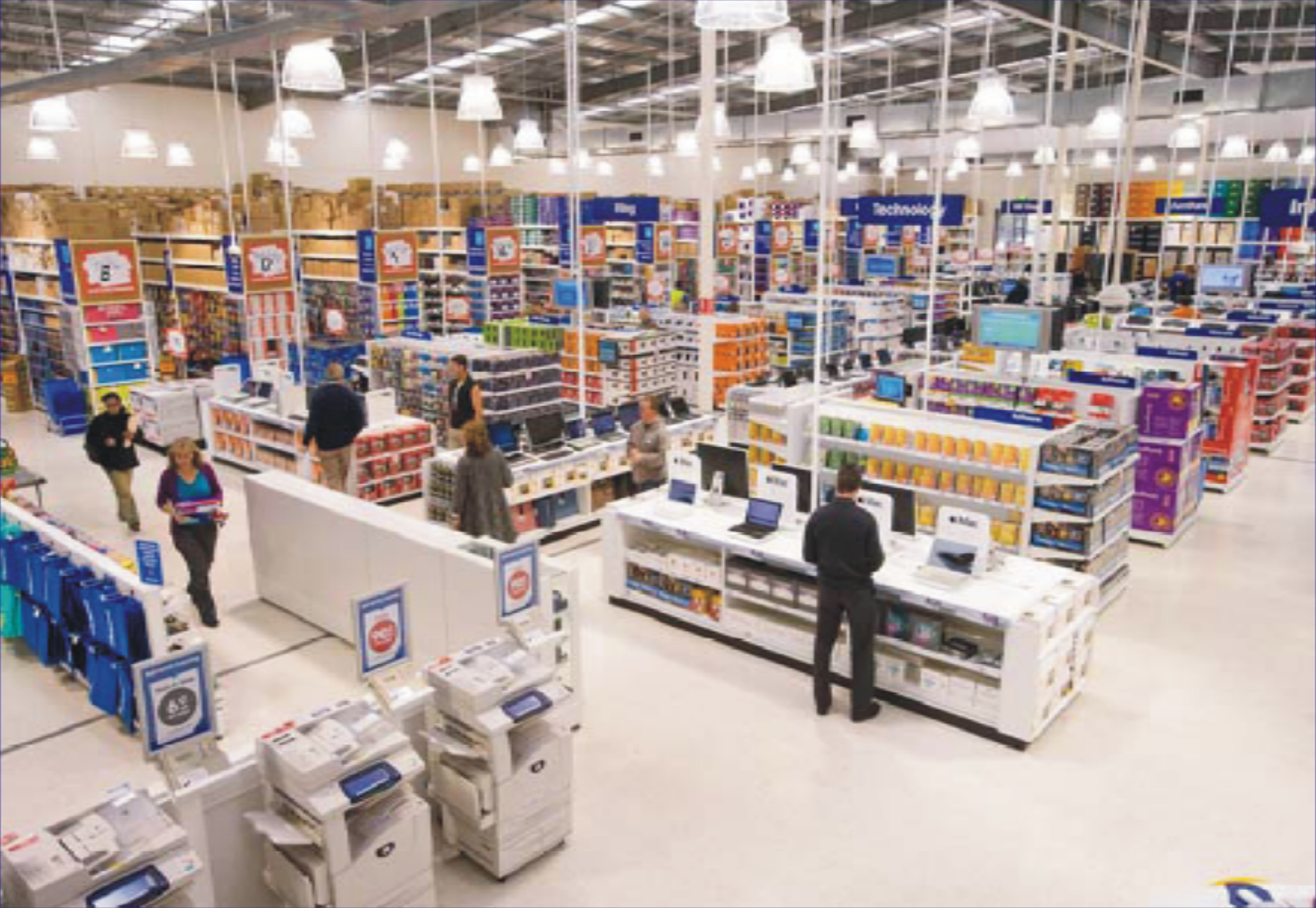
The advent of "category killers", such as Australia's Officeworks, has contributed to an increase in channel switching behaviour.

Channel-switching is the action of consumers switching from one type of channel intermediary to a different type of intermediary for their purchases. Examples include switching from brick-and-mortar stores to online catalogues and e-commerce providers; switching from grocery stores to convenience stores or switching from top tier department stores to mass market discount outlets. A number of factors have led to an increase in channel switching behaviour; the growth of e-commerce, the globalization of markets, the advent of category killers (such as Officeworks and Kids 'R Us) as well as changes in the legal or statutory environment. For instance, in Australia and New Zealand, following a relaxation of laws prohibiting supermarkets from selling therapeutic goods, consumers have gradually switched away from pharmacies and toward supermarkets for the purchase of minor analgesics, cough and cold preparations and complementary medicines such as vitamins and herbal remedies.

For the consumer, channel switching offers a more diverse shopping experience, which may concern some sellers by its potential to erode market share. Evidence of channel switching can suggest that disruptive forces are at play, and that consumer behaviour is undergoing fundamental changes. A consumer may be prompted to switch channels when the product or service can be found at cheaper prices, when superior models become available, when a wider range is offered, or simply because it is more convenient to shop through a different channel (e.g. online or one-stop shopping). As a hedge against market share losses due to switching behaviour, some retailers engage in multi-channel retailing.

=== Customer value ===
The emergence of a service-dominant logic perspective has focused scholarly attention on how distribution networks serve to create customer value and to consider how value is co-created by all the players within the distribution chain, including the value created by customers themselves. This emphasis on value-creation is contributing to a change in terminology surrounding distribution processes; "distribution networks" are often termed value-chains while "distribution centers" are often termed customer fulfillment centers. For example, the retail giant Amazon, which utilizes both direct online distribution alongside bricks and mortar stores, now calls its distribution centers "customer fulfillment centers". Although the term "customer fulfillment center" has been criticized on the grounds that it is a neologism, its use is becoming increasingly mainstream as it slowly makes its way into introductory marketing textbooks.

=== Disintermediation ===
Disintermediation occurs when manufacturers or service providers eliminate intermediaries from the distribution network and deal directly with purchasers. Disintermediation is found in industries where radically new types of channel intermediaries displace traditional distributors. The widespread public acceptance of online shopping has been a major trigger for disintermediation in some industries. Certain types of traditional intermediaries are dropping by the wayside.

== See also ==
- Lists of distribution companies
- Agricultural marketing
- All commodity volume
- Cargo
- Distribution (economics)
- Distribution resource planning
- Document automation in supply chain management and logistics
- Extended enterprise
- Good distribution practice (GDP)
- Liquid logistics
- Logistics
- Third-party logistics
- Marketing
- Marketing channel
- Marketing mix
- Pricing
- Promotion
- Retail
- Value chain
- Value network
- Value proposition
