= All-commodity volume =

Measurement of total annual sales volume of retailers

All-commodity volume or ACV represents the total annual sales volume of retailers that can be aggregated from individual store-level up to larger geographical sets. This measure is a ratio, and so is typically measured as a percentage (or on a scale from 0 to 100).

The total dollar sales that go into ACV include the entire store inventory sales, rather than sales for a specific category of products – hence the term "all commodity volume."

ACV is best related to the key marketing concept of placement (Distribution). Distribution metrics quantify the availability of products sold through retailers, usually as a percentage of all potential outlets. Often, outlets are weighted by their share of category sales or "all-commodity" sales. For marketers who sell through resellers, distribution metrics reveal a brand's percentage of market access. Balancing a firm's efforts in "push" (building and maintaining reseller and distribution support) and "pull" (generating customer demand) is an ongoing strategic concern for marketers.

== Purpose ==
All-commodity volume measures a firm's ability to convey a product to its customers in terms of total sales among outlets carrying the brand.

== Construction ==
All-commodity volume (ACV) is a weighted measure of product availability, or distribution, based on total store sales. In other words, ACV is the percentage of sales in all categories that are generated by the stores that stock a given brand (again, at least one SKU of that brand) (note: ACV can be expressed as a percentage or as a dollar value (total sales of stores carrying brand).

All Commodity Volume (ACV) Distribution (%) =
100 x Total Sales of Stores Carrying Brand ($) ÷ Total Sales of All Outlets ($)

== Usage discussion of ACV ==
This is the annual dollar sale for a geography in millions of dollars. When dividing total sales for an outlet into ACV million dollar blocks, it allows for equivalization across inherently different sized market or retailers in size. A large share of sales in Des Moines may or may not be as important as having a lesser share in New York City. The open question in the above case can be resolved by dividing sales regardless of outlet into a sales rate per million dollars.

=== Example calculation ===
Assume in a city there are two hardware retailers.

- The first retailer boasts five big-box store locations that boast weekly ACV (total sales of all products across all stores) of $15MM per week.
- The second retailer may also feature five store locations, but they tend to be closer to mom and pop size, with average weekly ACV at only $5MM per week.
- The total market size is ten hardware stores, and $20MM in total market ACV.

Assuming a tool-set a company produces is only distributed in the second smaller-store chain, it is obviously represented in half the store locations (50%). However, all stores are not created equal; based on the above numbers, the tool-set would only be selling in a quarter of the total market ACV (25%).

In the converse scenario of distribution within only the big-box retailer, the tool-set would similarly be distributed in half the stores, but those stores would represent 75% total market ACV.

Given the choice, a business typically prefers its distribution in higher-volume stores for the greater sales potential. More consumers spending more total dollars occurs in these outlets, indicating more traffic and/or average spend per consumer.

Within marketing and sales circles, the percentage of stores a product sells within is less relevant than a product's share of the store ACV value.

== Examples of application ==
Based on the above logic, common applications of ACV equivalization are as follows:

- The overall importance of one retailer vs. another in terms of sales volume, or even geographical locations (e.g., New York Metro vs. Omaha).
- An item (e.g., mayonnaise), or even grouping of items (e.g., grocery dry goods) has an average share of every million dollars of sales in a sales outlet, representing its overall importance to that outlet.
- As the example above, an item or aggregated grouping of items can have its distribution measured in equivalized fashion – what percentage of the total market ACV does a product actually sell in (i.e., appear on the shelf)?
- Related to share above, an item or category of items can have a sales rate per million dollars of ACV. This allows for comparison of how well an item sells in one outlet vs. another regardless of its overall distribution. This is often referred to as weighted sales velocity.
- What percentage of ACV$ in a market is a product or grouping benefiting from trade merchandising such as feature advertisements, in-store point of sale display, coupons, etc. One can then deduce how much one time period has extra merchandising support versus another.

== See also ==
- Numeric distribution
- Product category volume
- Category performance ratio
