= Co-creation =

Product or service design process

Co-creation, in the context of a business, refers to a collaborative product or service design process in which consumers directly participate in ideation, development, and value creation. Unlike passive customer feedback mechanisms such as surveys or post-launch reviews, active co-creation involves continuous, direct customer collaboration throughout the design and development lifecycle. The term is also used more broadly to describe organizational frameworks that invite consumers to actively contribute ideas, designs, or original content alongside internal teams. Another meaning is the creation of value by ordinary people, whether for a commercial firm or an open initiative. The first person to use the "co-" in "co-creation" as a marketing prefix was Koichi Shimizu, professor of Josai University, in 1979. In 1979, "co-marketing" was introduced at the Japan Society of Commerce's national conference. Everything with "Co" comes from here.

== Co-Creation Typology ==
Aric Rindfleisch and Matt O'Hern define customer co-creation in digital marketing as "a collaborative NPD (new product development) activity in which customers actively contribute and/or select the content of a new product offering" and state that, like all NPD processes, it consists of two steps, namely contribution (of content) and selection (of the best contributions).

Rindfleisch and O'Hern categorize different types of co-creation in digital marketing based on how strict the requirements on submissions are (fixed vs. open) and if the selection is done by the customers themselves or by the firm (firm-led vs. customer-led). They distinguish four types of co-creation, which roughly correspond to the four possible combinations of the contribution and selection styles like this below:

1. Collaborating: open contribution, customer-led selection
2. Tinkering: open contribution, firm-led selection
3. Co-designing: fixed contribution, customer-led selection
4. Submitting: fixed contribution, firm-led selection

=== Collaborating ===
According to O'Hern and Rindfleisch (2019), the best example of open contribution and customer-led selection is open-source software. They note that while open-source software is not typically commercial, some firms use it as part of their strategy; the examples they give are of Sun Microsystems with NetBeans and of IBM paying people to improve Linux. According to Aric Rindfleisch, Collaboration is a form in which the companies have the least control, while submission is the form that provides companies with the most control.

=== Tinkering ===
O'Hern and Rindfleisch describe what they call "tinkering" as having fewer open contributions than "collaborating". Customers are allowed to tinker with the product, but only in certain ways, and to make their creations available to others, but only under certain conditions. They give the examples of mods for video games and public APIs. Whether or not the user creations are incorporated into the official product is decided by the firm, so selection is firm-led.

=== Co-designing ===
"Co-designing", as described by O'Hern and Rindfleisch, is a type of co-creation process in which a number of customers, the "co-designers", submit product designs to the firm, with a larger group of customers selecting which designs the firm will produce. With co-designing, there are often relatively strict submission requirements, so it is categorized as having fixed contribution. They give the example of Threadless, a website selling user-designed T-shirts, which typically accepted two percent of customer submissions for product designs. Another example can be Lego which has introduced the "Lego Ideas" platform to rope in the users to contribute a newer design. Once the design garners 10,000 supporters, Lego forwards the idea to the expert review phase. If selected by the experts at Lego, they actually bring it on their Lego store shelves. As this shows there are also hybrids of different co-creation types. In this case the Lego Ideas platform includes parts of co-designing and submitting because the customer and the company choose the final product.

=== Submitting ===
O'Hern's and Rindfleisch's concept of "submitting" is closest to traditional NPD in that the selection of ideas is entirely done by the firm and there are often strict criteria contributions must follow. "Submitting"-type co-creation is different from traditional market research in that the firm asks people to come up with their own detailed solutions or designs, rather than just answering pre-determined questions. According to O'Hern and Rindfleisch, typical examples of this type of co-creation are a firm organizing a competition or using a crowdsourcing platform like InnoCentive. Selected ideas are often rewarded with money.

== History of the term ==
In 1972, Koichi Shimizu devised the "4Cs of marketing mix (Commodity, Cost, Communication, Channel)." "Commodity" is a Latin word that means "comfortable together," so the term "co-created goods and services."

In 1979, Koichi Shimizu announced the concept of "co-marketing" at an academic conference. The framework is the "7Cs Compass Model", which is shown by the 7Cs and the compass needle (NWSE). [Corporation(C-O-S)]: Competitor, Organization, Stakeholder, [4Cs]: Commodity, Cost, Communication, Channel, [Consumer]: Needs, Wants, Security, Education, [Circumstances]: National and international, Weather, Social and Cultural, Economic. Commodity in this is Latin for "Commodus: both convenient, both comfortable." Therefore, Commodity is "Co-creation Goods and Services."

In their review of the literature on "customer participation in production", Neeli Bendapudi and Robert P. Leone found that the first academic work dates back to 1979.

In 1990, John Czepiel suggests that customer's participation may lead to greater customer satisfaction. Also in 1990, Scott Kelley, James Donnelly and Steven J. Skinner suggest other ways to look at customer participation: quality, employee's performance, and emotional responses.

An article by R. Normann and R. Ramirez written in 1993 suggests that successful companies do not focus on themselves or even on the industry but on the value-creating system. Michel, Vargo and Lusch acknowledged that something similar to their concept of co-creation can be found in Normann's work - particularly, they consider his idea of "density of offerings" to be valuable.

In 1995, Michael Schrage argues that not all customers are alike in their capacity to bring some kind of knowledge to the firm.

In 1995, Firat, Fuat, Dholakia, and Venkatesh introduce the concept "customerization" as a form of buyer-centric mass-customization and state that it would enable consumers to act as a co-producer. However, Bendapudi and Leone (2003) conclude that "the assumption of greater customization under co-production may hold only when the customer has the expertise".

The term "co-creation" was initially framed as a strategy by Kambil and coauthors in two articles in 1996 and 1999. In "Reinventing Value Propositions" (1996), Kambil, Ginsberg and Bloch present co-creation as a strategy to transform value propositions working with customers or complementary resources. In "Co-creation: A new source of value" (1999), Kambil, Friesen and Sundaram present co-creation as an important source of value enabled by the Internet and analyze what risks companies must consider in utilizing this strategy.

In 2000, C. K. Prahalad and Venkat Ramaswamy popularized the concept in their article "Co-Opting Customer Competence". In their book The future of competition (2004), they defined co-creation as the "joint creation of value by the company and the customer; allowing the customer to co-construct the service experience to suit their context".

Also in 2004, Vargo and Lush introduce their "service-dominant logic" of marketing. One of its "foundational premises" was "the customer is always a coproducer". Prahalad commented that the authors did not go far enough.

In 2006, Kalaignanam and Varadarajan analyze the implications of information technology for co-creation. They state that developments in IT will support co-creation. They introduce a conceptual model of customer participation as a function of the characteristics of the product, the market, the customer and the firm. They suggest demand-side issues may have a negative effect on satisfaction.

In the mid-2000s, co-creation and similar concepts such as crowdsourcing and open innovation were popularized greatly, for instance by the book Wikinomics.

In 2013 Jansen and Pieters argue that co-creation is often used as a buzzword and can mean many different things. The term is used incorrectly to refer to forms of market research, such as focus groups or social media analysis. They say simply working together with or collecting input from customers is also not enough to be called co-creation - it should only be called co-creation if "the end user plays an active role and it is a continuous process". They introduced the term "complete co-creation" for this, with the following definition: "a transparent process of value creation in ongoing, productive collaboration with, and supported by all relevant parties, with end-users playing a central role" (Jansen and Pieters, 2017, p. 15). Complete co-creation is regarded as a practical answer to the predominantly academic and holistic understanding of co-creation.

The concept of value co-creation has been also applied to the educational field where Dolinger, Lodge & Coates define it as the "process of students' feedback, opinions, and other resources such as their intellectual capabilities and personalities, integrated alongside institutional resources".

== As a way of thinking about value ==
Co-creation can be seen as a new way of thinking about the economical concept of "value." Prahalad & Ramaswamy describe it as a "consumer-centric" view in opposition to the traditional "company-centric" view. In the traditional view, the consumer is not part of the value creation process, while in the consumer-centric view the consumer plays a key role in it. In the traditional view, the company decides on the methods and structure of the process, while in the consumer-centric view the consumer can influence those. In the traditional view, the goal is to extract value money from consumers in the form of money, while in the consumer-centric view, the goal is to create value together for both consumer and company. In the traditional view, there is one point of exchange controlled by the company, while in the consumer-centric view, there are multiple points of exchange where company and consumers come together.

== The four building blocks of interaction ==
Prahalad and Ramaswamy suggested that in order to apply co-creation, the following fundamental requirements should be prepared in advance.

Terms	Definition	Managerial Implication
Dialogue	Interaction between customer	Two-way connection instead of one-way selling strategy
Access	Allow customer to access the data	Create value with customer; beyond traditional value chain process
Risk-benefit	To monitor risk and gaps between customer and firm	Share the risk of product development with guest through communication (In later work of Ramaswamy, this is replaced by "reflexivity")
Transparency	Information among business is accessible	Information barriers should be eliminated to certain degree in order to gain trust from guest

== Advantages ==
Co-created value arises in the form of personalized experiences for the customer and ongoing revenue, learning and customer loyalty and word of mouth for the firm. Co-creation also enable customers to come up with their own idea which might help the firm.

Ramaswamy and his co-author Francis Gouillart wrote: "Through their interactions with thousands of managers globally who had begun experimenting with co-creation, they discovered that enterprises were building platforms that engaged not only the firm and its customers but also the entire network of suppliers, partners, and employees, in a continuous development of new experiences with individuals."

== Steps involved in Co-creation ==
There are two key steps involved in co-creation: 1. CONTRIBUTION- customers must submit contributions. 2. SELECTION- firm must select a few valuable contributions from a larger set.

As outlined by Fisher and Rindfleisch (2023), these two steps face the following challenges:

CONTRIBUTION CHALLENGES: 1. Attracting and motivating external contributors; 2. Incremental ideas; 3. The "Rule of One."

SELECTION CHALLENGES: 1. Protecting contributors' egos; 2. Harvesting co-created value; 3. Maintaining the peace.

== Risks ==
If the ideas highlight negative sides of the firm's products or services, there might be a risk in losing out on the brand image.

A design contest or other co-creation event may backfire and lead to negative word of mouth if the expectations of the participants are not met.

The risk of the selection process is that most submissions are not very useful, impractical and difficult to implement. Firms have to deal with the submitted ideas in a very subtle way as throughout the process they don't want to reject customer submissions and risk alienating them which may eventually lead to customer disengagement.

Unless customers are incentivized in an attractive way, they may be reluctant to participate and benefit the company.

Due to these risks, co-creation is an attractive but uncertain innovation strategy. In fact, several prominent co-creation examples have failed, including Local Motors, Dell IdeaStorm and MyStarbucksIdeas.

In order to help firms assess and manage these risks, Fisher & Rindfleisch (2023) developed the CO-CREATION READINESS SCORECARD. This Scorecard asks 12 questions (6 focus on Contribution Readiness & 6 focus on Selection Readiness).

== See also ==
- Co-design
- Co-marketing
- Crowdsourcing
- Market research
- Marketing mix
- Open-source software development
- Service-dominant logic
