= Category performance ratio =

Business analysis metric

Category performance ratio refers to the relative performance of a retailer in a given product category, compared with its performance in all product categories. Distribution metrics quantify the availability of products sold through retailers, usually as a percentage of all potential outlets. Often, outlets are weighted by their share of category sales or “all commodity” sales. For marketers who sell through resellers, distribution metrics reveal a brand’s percentage of market access. Balancing a firm’s efforts in “push” (building and maintaining reseller and distribution support) and “pull” (generating customer demand) is an ongoing strategic concern for marketers.

== Purpose ==
Category performance ratio provides insight into whether a brand’s distribution network is more or less effective in selling the category of which that brand is a part, compared with its average effectiveness in selling all categories in which members of that network compete.

== Construction ==
Category Performance Ratio = PCV (%) ÷ ACV (%)

If a distribution network’s category performance ratio is greater than 1, then the outlets comprising that network perform comparatively better in selling the category in question than in selling other categories, relative to the market as a whole.

== See also ==
- Numeric distribution
- All commodity volume
- Product category volume
