= Numeric distribution =

Numeric distribution is based on the number of outlets that carry a product (that is, outlets that list at least one of the product's stock-keeping units, or SKUs). It is defined as the percentage of stores that stock a given brand or SKU, within the universe of stores in the relevant market.

Distribution metrics quantify the availability of products sold through retailers, usually as a percentage of all potential outlets. Often, outlets are weighted by their share of category sales or “all commodity” sales. For marketers who sell through resellers, distribution metrics reveal a brand's percentage of market access. Balancing a firm's efforts in “push” (building and maintaining reseller and distribution support) and “pull” (generating customer demand) is an ongoing strategic concern for marketers.

== Purpose ==
Numeric distribution measures a firm's ability to convey a product to its customers in terms of total number of outlets carrying the brand. The main use of metric distribution is to understand how many physical locations stock a product or brand. This has implications for delivery systems and for the cost of servicing these outlets.

== Construction ==
To calculate numeric distribution, marketers divide the number of stores that stock at least one SKU of a product or brand by the number of outlets in the relevant market:

Numeric Distribution (%) =
100 x Number of Outlets Carrying Brand (#) ÷ Total Number of Outlets (#)

== See also ==
- All commodity volume
- Product category volume
- Category performance ratio
