= Marketing mix =

Model for businesses

The marketing mix (4 Ps) is the set of controllable elements or variables that a company uses to influence and meet the needs of its target customers in the most effective and efficient way possible. These elements are sometimes sorted into the categories of product, price, place, and promotion (also known as the "4 Ps"). The marketing mix has been defined as the "set of marketing tools that the firm uses to pursue its marketing objectives in the target market".

Marketing theory emerged in the early twenty-first century. The contemporary marketing mix which has become the dominant framework for marketing management decisions was first published in 1984. In services marketing, an extended marketing mix is used, typically comprising 7 Ps (product, price, promotion, place, people, process, physical evidence), made up of the original 4 Ps extended by process, people and physical evidence. Occasionally service marketers will refer to 8 Ps (product, price, place, promotion, people, positioning, packaging, and performance), comprising these 7 Ps plus performance.

In the 1970s, Professor Koichi Shimizu proposed the 4 Cs (commodity, cost, channel, and communication). A newer 4 Cs model emerged in the 1990's as a more customer-driven replacement of the 4 Ps created by Professor Robert Lauterborn, consisting of the 4 Cs (consumer, cost, convenience, and communication).

The correct arrangement of marketing mix by enterprise marketing managers plays an important role in the success of a company's marketing:

1. Develop strengths and avoid weaknesses
2. Strengthen the competitiveness and adaptability of enterprises
3. Ensure the internal departments of the enterprise work closely together

== Emergence and growth ==
The origins of the 4 Ps can be traced to the late 1940s. The first known mention of a mix has been attributed to a Professor of Marketing at Harvard University, James Culliton. In 1948, Culliton published an article entitled The Management of Marketing Costs, in which he describes marketers as "mixers of ingredients". Years later, Culliton's colleague, Professor Neil Borden, published a retrospective article detailing the early history of the marketing mix in which he claims that he was inspired by Culliton's idea of "mixers", and credits himself with popularising the concept of the "marketing mix". According to Borden's account, he used the term "marketing mix" consistently from the late 1940s: for instance, he is known to have used the term "marketing mix" in his presidential address given to the American Marketing Association (AMA) in 1953. Borden did not define the mix, seeing the idea simply as a composition of "the important elements of ingredients" of a marketing programme.

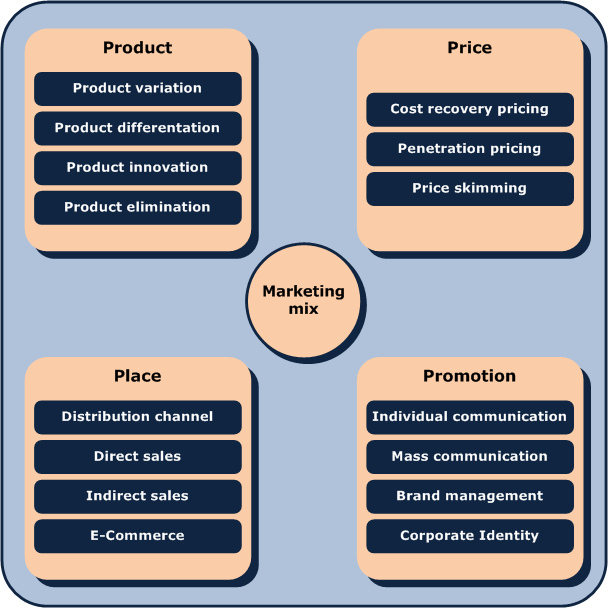
Marketing mix diagram

Although the idea of marketers as "mixers of ingredients" caught on, marketers could not reach any real consensus about what elements should be included in the mix until the 1960s. Early schemas to define "mix" include:

- John Howard's 1957 definition of four groups: product, price, channel, and promotion;
- Albert Frey's 1961 distinction between the "offering" (product, brand, and price) and the "methods and tools" such as advertising, sales promotion, personal selling, publicity, distribution channels, marketing research, and strategy; and
- Lazer and Kelly's 1962 model, which distinguished between the goods mix (product, brand, and price), the distribution mix (channels and physical distribution), and the communication mix (advertising and sales).

The 4 Ps, in its modern form, was first proposed in 1960 by E. Jerome McCarthy, who presented them within a managerial approach that covered analysis, consumer behavior, market research, market segmentation, and planning. Philip Kotler popularised this approach and helped spread the 4 Ps model, noting its value from a "pedagogical point of view". McCarthy's 4 Ps have been widely adopted by both marketing academics and practitioners.

The prospect of extending the marketing mix first took hold at the inaugural AMA conference dedicated to Services Marketing in the early 1980s, and built on earlier theoretical works pointing to many important limitations of the 4 Ps model. Taken collectively, the papers presented at that conference indicate that service marketers were thinking about a revision to the general marketing mix based on an understanding that services were fundamentally different from products, and therefore required different tools and strategies. In 1981, Booms and Bitner proposed a model of 7 Ps, comprising the original 4 Ps extended by process, people and physical evidence, as being more applicable for services marketing.

Since then, there have been a number of different proposals for a service marketing mix (with various numbers of Ps); most notably the 8 Ps, comprising the 7 Ps above, extended by 'performance'.

== McCarthy's 4 Ps ==
The original marketing mix, or 4 Ps, as originally proposed by marketers and academic Philip Kotler and E. Jerome McCarthy, provides a framework for marketing decision-making. McCarthy's marketing mix has since become one of the most enduring and widely accepted frameworks in marketing. McCarthy's 4 Ps has remained influential in marketing theory and practice, serving as a cornerstone for analyzing and optimizing marketing strategies in various industries.

Table 1: Brief Outline of 4 Ps
Category	Definition/Explanation/Concept	Typical Marketing Decisions
Product	A product refers to an item that satisfies the consumer's needs or wants. Products may be tangible (goods) or intangible (services, ideas, or experiences).	Product design – features, quality; Product assortment – product range, product mix, product lines; Branding; Packaging and labeling; Services (complimentary service, after-sales service, service level); Guarantees and warranties; Returns; Managing products through the life-cycle
Price	Price refers to the amount a customer pays for a product. Price may also be a consumer's expectation for getting a certain product (e.g. time or effort). Price is the only variable that has implications for revenue. Price is the only part of the marketing mix that talks about the value for the firm. Price also includes considerations of customer perceived value.	Price strategy; Price tactics; Price-setting; Allowances – e.g. rebates for distributors; Discounts – for customers; Payment terms – credit, payment methods
Place	Refers to providing customer access Considers providing convenience for consumers.	Strategies such as intensive distribution, selective distribution, exclusive distribution; Franchising; Market coverage; Channel member selection and channel member relationships; Assortment; Location decisions; Inventory; Transport, warehousing and logistics
Promotion	Promotion refers to marketing communications May comprise elements such as: advertising, PR, direct marketing and sales promotion.	Promotional mix - the appropriate balance of advertising, PR, direct marketing, and sales promotion; Message strategy - what is to be communicated; Channel/ media strategy - how to reach the target audience; Message frequency - how often to communicate

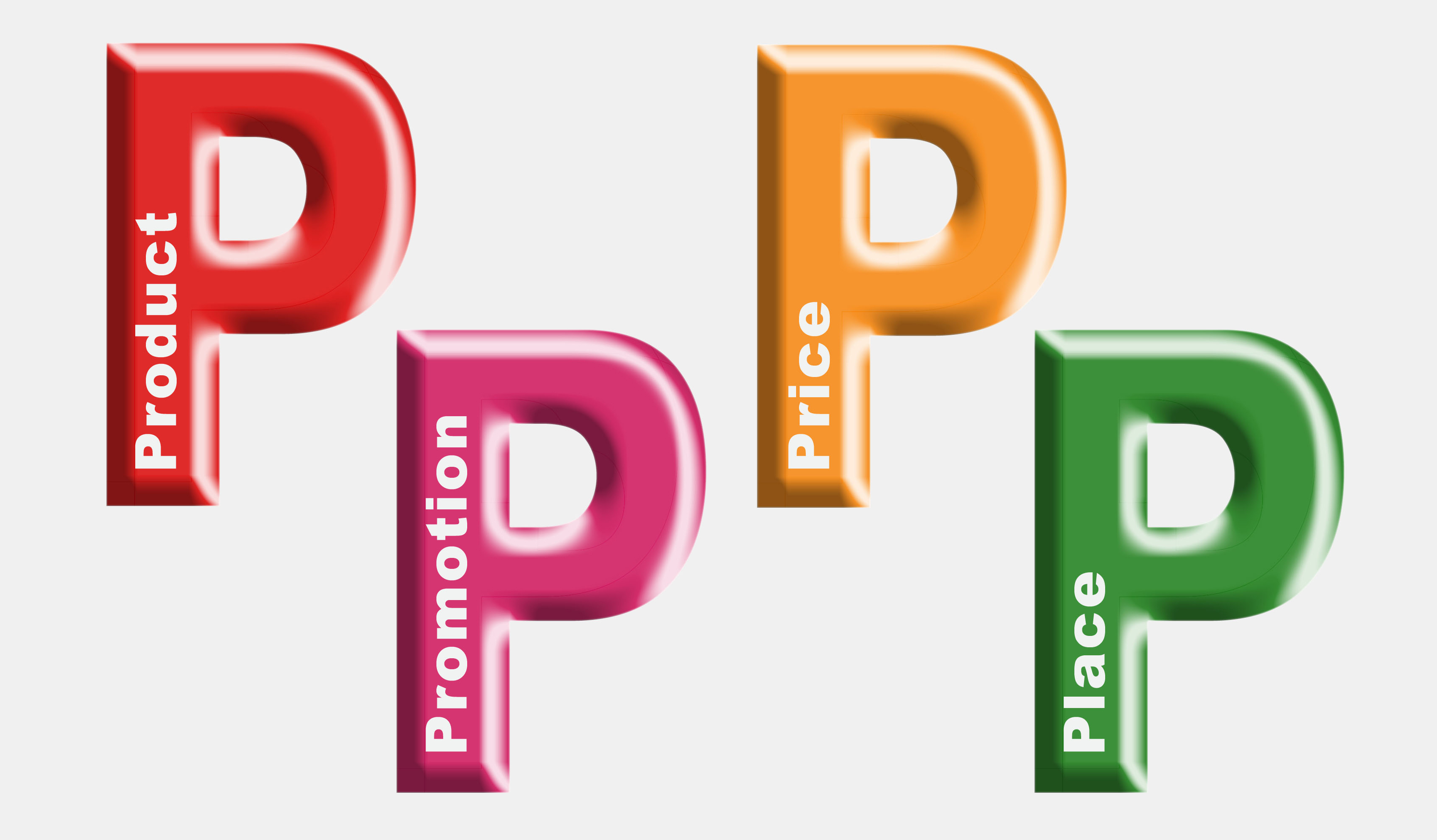
The 4Ps have been the cornerstone of the managerial approach to marketing since the 1960s

Product refers to what the business offers for sale and may include products or services. Product decisions include the "quality, features, benefits, style, design, branding, packaging, services, warranties, guarantees, life cycles, investments and returns".

Price refers to decisions surrounding "list pricing, discount pricing, special offer pricing, credit payment or credit terms". Price refers to the total cost to a customer to acquire the product, and may involve both monetary and psychological costs such as the time and effort spent in acquisition. Distribution channels taken into consideration including retailer, wholesaler, Business to Business or Business to Customer.

Place is defined as the "direct or indirect channels to market, geographical distribution, territorial coverage, retail outlet, market location, catalogues, inventory, logistics, and order fulfillment". Place refers either to the physical location where a business carries out business or the distribution channels used to reach markets. Place may refer to a retail outlet, but increasingly, refers to virtual stores such as "a mail order catalogue, a telephone call centre, or a website. Example, firms that produce luxury goods like Louis Vuitton employ an intensive placement strategy by making their products available at only a few exclusive retailers. In contrast, lower priced consumer goods like toothpaste and shampoo, typically employ an extensive placement strategy by making their products available to as many different retailers as possible."

Promotion refers to "the marketing communication used to make the offer known to potential customers and persuade them to investigate it further". Promotion elements include advertising, public relations, direct selling and sales promotions.

== Modified and expanded marketing mix: "Seven P's" ==
By the 1980s, a number of theorists were calling for an expanded and modified framework that would be more useful to service marketers. The prospect of expanding or modifying the marketing mix for services was a core discussion topic at the inaugural AMA Conference dedicated to Services Marketing in the early 1980s, and built on earlier theoretical works pointing to many important problems and limitations of the 4 Ps model. Taken collectively, the papers presented at that conference indicate that service marketers were thinking about a revision to the general marketing mix based on an understanding that services were fundamentally different from products, and therefore required different tools and strategies. In 1981, Booms and Bitner proposed a model of 7 Ps, comprising the original 4 Ps plus people, process, and physical evidence, as being more applicable for services marketing.

Table 2: Outline of the Expanded Marketing Mix Elements
Category	Definition/ Explanation	Typical Marketing Decisions
People	Human actors who participate in service delivery. Service personnel who represent the company's values to customers. Interactions between customers. Interactions between employees and customers.	Staff recruitment and training; Uniforms; Scripting; Queuing systems, managing waits; Handling complaints, service failures; Managing social interactions
Process	The procedures, mechanisms and flow of activities by which service is delivered.	Process design; Blueprinting (i.e. flowcharting) service processes; Standardization vs customization decisions; Diagnosing fail-points, critical incidents and system failures; Monitoring and tracking service performance; Analysis of resource requirements and allocation; Creation and measurement of key performance indicators (KPIs); Alignment with Best Practices; Preparation of operations manuals
Physical evidence	The environment in which service occurs. The space where customers and service personnel interact. Tangible commodities (e.g. equipment, furniture) that facilitate service performance. Artifacts that remind customers of a service performance.	Facilities (e.g. furniture, equipment, access); Spatial layout (e.g. functionality, efficiency); Signage (e.g. directional signage, symbols, other signage); Interior design (e.g. furniture, color schemes); Ambient conditions (e.g. noise, air, temperature); Design of livery (e.g. stationery, brochures, menus, etc.); Artifacts: (e.g. souvenirs, mementos, etc.)

People are essential in the marketing of any product or service. Personnel stand for the service. In the professional, financial, or hospitality service industry, people are not producers, but rather the products themselves. When people are the product, they impact public perception of an organization as much as any tangible consumer goods. From a marketing management perspective, it is important to ensure that employees represent the company in alignment with broader messaging strategies. This is easier to ensure when people feel as though they have been treated fairly and earn wages sufficient to support their daily lives.

Process refers to a "set of activities that results in delivery of the product benefits". A process could be a sequential order of tasks that an employee undertakes as a part of their job. It can represent sequential steps taken by a number of various employees while attempting to complete a task. Some people are responsible for managing multiple processes at once. For example, a restaurant manager should monitor the performance of employees, ensuring that processes are followed. They are also expected to supervise while customers are promptly greeted, seated, fed, and led out so that the next customer can begin this process.

Physical evidence refers to the non-human elements of the service encounter, including equipment, furniture and facilities. It may also refer to the more abstract components of the environment in which the service encounter occurs including interior design, colour schemes and layout. Some aspects of physical evidence provide lasting proof that the service has occurred, such as souvenirs, mementos, invoices and other livery of artifacts. According to Booms and Bitner's framework, the physical evidence is "the service delivered and any tangible goods that facilitate the performance and communication of the service": it is important to customers because the tangible goods are evidence of the quality and level of service which a customer can expect.

Rafiq and Ahmed add that, although Booms and Bittner had service marketing in mind when adding these three Ps, it is "difficult to maintain" the position that services should have a more complex marketing mix than goods. They argue instead for a "generic" marketing mix, quoting from the work of the Harvard economist Theodore Levitt, who questioned the abiding distinction between goods and services:

Everybody sells intangibles in the marketplace, no matter what is produced in the factory ...

== Lauterborn's 4 Cs (1990) ==
Robert F. Lauterborn proposed a 4 Cs classification in 1990. His classification is a more consumer-orientated version of the 4 Ps that attempts to better fit the movement from mass marketing to niche marketing:

4 Ps	4 Cs	Definition
Product	Consumer wants and needs	A company will only sell what the consumer specifically wants to buy. So, marketers should study consumer wants and needs in order to attract them one by one with something they want to purchase.
Price	Cost	Price is only a part of the total cost to satisfy a want or a need. The total cost will consider for example the cost of time in acquiring a good or a service, a cost of conscience by consuming that or even a cost of guilt "for not treating the kids". It reflects the total cost of ownership. Many factors affect cost, including but not limited to the customer's cost to change or implement the new product or service and the customer's cost for not selecting a competitor's product or service.
Place	Convenience	In the era of Internet, catalogues, credit cards and phones, consumers neither need to go anywhere to satisfy a want or a need nor are they limited to a few places to satisfy them. Marketers should know how the target market prefers to buy, how to be there and be ubiquitous, in order to guarantee convenience to buy. With the rise of Internet and hybrid models of purchasing, Place is becoming less relevant. Convenience takes into account the ease of buying the product, finding the product, finding information about the product, and several other factors.
Promotion	Communication	While promotion is "manipulative" and from the seller, communication is "cooperative" and from the buyer with the aim to create a dialogue with the potential customers based on their needs and lifestyles. It represents a broader focus. Communications can include advertising, public relations, personal selling, viral advertising, and any form of communication between the organization and the consumer.

== Shimizu's 4 Cs and 7 Cs Compass Model ==
Koichi Shimizu, a professor at Josai University proposed a 4 Cs classification of the marketing mix in 1973. Then in 1979, it was expanded to the 7 Cs Compass Model. The 7 Cs Compass Model is a framework of co-marketing, a marketing strategy where business entities collaborate closely in their marketing efforts. It can involve the co-creation of marketing for a company where consumers contribute to co-marketing. Co-marketing (or collaborative marketing) is a marketing practice where two companies cooperate with separate distribution channels, sometimes including profit sharing. It is frequently confused with co-promotion. Commensal (symbiotic) marketing is marketing where both corporation and a corporation, a corporation and a consumer etc. can coexist in a mutually beneficial way.

The core of 4 Cs is the corporation itself (company and non profit organization) Other elements include competitors, organizations, and stakeholders within the corporation. The company has to think of compliance and accountability as important. The competition in the areas in which the company competes with other firms in its industry.

The 7Cs Compass Model extends the 4Cs classification (commodity, cost, communication, channel) with three additional classifications. The 4Cs model provides a demand/customer co-creation alternative to the well-known 4Ps supply side model (product, price, promotion, place) of marketing management.

- Product → Commodity
- Price → Cost
- Promotion → Communication
- Place → Channel

"P" category (narrow)	"C" category (broad)	"C" definition
	(C1) Corporation	
Product	(C2) Commodity	(Latin derivation: commodus=both convenient and happy): Co-creation goods and services. The goods and services created by corporations and consumers together. Commodity here is different from commoditization. Product out is useless. It is no good to buy it because we made it.
Price	(C3) Cost	(Latin derivation: constare= It makes sacrifices together): Producing cost, selling cost, purchasing cost and Costs for society and the global environment.
Promotion	(C4) Communication	(Latin derivation: communis=sharing of meaning) : marketing communication: Better to use communication than promotion. Promotion has the meaning of pushing forward, but communication has the meaning of communicating with each other. Communications can include advertising, sales promotion, public relations, publicity, personal selling, corporate identity, internal communication, IMC, MIS, SNS,.
Place	(C5) Channel	(Latin derivation: canal) : marketing channels. Flow of goods.

The compass of consumers and circumstances (environment) are:

- (C6) Consumer – (Needle of compass to consumer)

The factors related to consumers can be explained by the first character of four directions marked on the compass model. These can be remembered by the cardinal directions, hence the name compass model:
- N = Needs
- S = Security: The keywords not found in other models.
- E = Education: (consumer education)
- W = Wants

- (C7) Circumstances – (Needle of compass to circumstances )

In addition to the consumer, there are various uncontrollable external environmental factors encircling the companies. Here it can also be explained by the first character of the four directions marked on the compass model:
- N = National and International (Political, legal and ethical) environment
- S = Social and cultural
- E = Economic
- W = Weather: The keywords not found in other models. Consideration of extreme weather, climate change and natural disasters is necessary to make the earth sustainable.

These can also be remembered by the cardinal directions marked on a compass. The 7 Cs Compass Model is a framework in co-marketing (symbiotic marketing). It has been criticized for being little more than the 4 Ps with different points of emphasis. In particular, the 7 Cs inclusion of consumers in the marketing mix is criticized, since they are a target of marketing, while the other elements of the marketing mix are tactics. The 7 Cs also include numerous strategies for product development, distribution, and pricing, while assuming that consumers want two-way communications with companies.

== Digital marketing mix ==
The digital marketing mix is fundamentally the same as Marketing Mix, which is an adaptation of Product, Price, Place and Promotion into digital marketing aspect. Digital marketing can be commonly explained as 'Achieving marketing objectives through applying digital technologies'.

=== Product ===
Thanks to the interaction and connection of the Internet, product has been redefined as "virtual product" in the digital marketing aspect, which is regarded as the combination of tangibility and intangibility. Through the form of digital, a product can be directly sent from manufacturers to customers. For example, customers could buy music in the form of an MP3 rather than buy it in the form of a physical CD. As a result, when a company is making strategy for Internet marketing, it is necessary to understand how to vary their products in the online environment. Here are some indications of adapt the product element on the Internet.

- Modifying the core product: In this case, it particularly refers to the products that can be remodeled into digital forms including movies, music, books and other publishing etc. Take Netflix as an example. The wide use of Internet has changed its form of products from selling and renting DVDs through retail stores into selling and renting video online.
- Providing digital products: In order to gain market shares in the Internet, companies need to widen its product range. For example, a psychological counseling could offer online consultation via video calls.
- Building the whole product: Apart from selling products online, Amazon.com also provides a paid subscription service called Amazon Prime, with which customers could enjoy free delivery and videos on Amazon.
- Conducting online research: The Internet offers a low-cost and convenient way of making marketing researches, which is helpful for companies to find out what products or services do customers prefer.

=== Price ===
Price concerns about the pricing policies or pricing models from a company. Due to the wide use of the Internet, many applications could be found in both consumers' and producers' perspectives. From the consumer's side, the Internet enables people to make a comparison to real-time prices before they make a consumption decision, which is time-saving and effort-saving for the consumers. As for the suppliers, they can adjust prices in the real-time and provide higher degree of price transparency with customers. Besides, the Internet is more likely to ease the pressure on price because online-producers do not have to put budget on renting a physical store. Hence, making new or adjusting pricing strategies is essential for the company that wants to enter the Internet market.

=== Place ===
With the application of the Internet, place is playing an increasingly important role in promoting consumption since the Internet and the physical channels become virtual. The major contribution from the Internet to the business is not only making it possible to selling products online, but also enabling companies to build relationships with customers. Furthermore, since the convenience of navigating from one site to another, place from the digital marketing perspective is always linked with promotion, which means retailers often use third-party websites such as Google search engine to guide customers to visit their websites.

=== Promotion ===
Promotion refers to selecting the target markets, locating and integrating various communication tools in the marketing mix. Unlike the traditional marketing communication tools, tools in digital marketing aim at engaging audiences by putting advertisements and content on the social media, including display ads, pay-per-click (PPC), search engine optimisation (SEO), influencers etc. When creating online marketing campaigns, Chaffey and Smith suggested that they can be separated into six groups:

- Search marketing, including search engine optimisation(SEO), pay-per-click(PPC).
- Online PR, encouraging positive comments about one's products or services while reducing negative comments.
- Online partnerships, building relationships between third-party webs to promote products or services.
- Interactive advertising
- Opt-in e-mail advertising
- Social media marketing, starting and participating in customer to customer, customer to company interaction through social media.

== The Internet Mix ==
The Internet Mix was first proposed by Sidney (Sid) Peimer in a 2004 article in Bizcommunity, where he identified the Internet Mix as consisting of three elements:

- Sell (trade)
- Tell (inform)
- Dwell (entertain)

== See also ==
- E. Jerome McCarthy
- Marketing
- Advertising
- Co-creation
- Co-marketing
- Marketing mix modeling
