= Liquid logistics =

Liquid logistics is a special category of logistics that relates to liquid products, and is used extensively in the "supply chain for liquids" discipline.

Standard logistics techniques are generally used for discrete or unit products. Liquid products have logistics characteristics that distinguish them from discrete products. Some of the major characteristics of liquid products that impact their logistics handling are:

- Liquids flowing from a higher level to a lower level provide the ability to move the liquids without mechanical propulsion or manual intervention.
- Liquids' adaptation to the shape of the container they are in provides a great deal of flexibility in the design of storage systems and the use of “dead” space for storage.
- The level of a liquid as it has settled in a tank may be used to automatically and continuously know the quantity of liquid in the tank.
- Liquids provide indications through changes in their characteristics that may be sensed and translated into measures of the quality of the liquid.
- Many security and safety risks are significantly reduced or eliminated using liquid logistics techniques. Tools such as liquid level sensors and flow meters can be useful in reducing security risk by providing directly, near real-time and accurate measurements of product's movement and balance along the supply-chain flow. The safety risk is reducing as product movement through the process of supply stream is independent and controlled.
- Liquids may in some cases be "processed" well downstream from the original production facility and thus offer the opportunity for improved efficiencies throughout the supply stream together with more flexibility as to the nature of the product at the point of final usage.

Each of these points represents a differentiation of liquid logistics from logistics techniques used for discrete items. When properly planned for and handled these points of differentiation may lead to business advantages for companies that produce, process, move, or use liquid products.

== See also ==
- Document automation in supply chain management & logistics
