= Co-promotion =

Co-promotion is a marketing practice that allows two or more companies to combine their sales force in order to promote a product under the same brand name and price with a single marketing strategy. It is considered as one of the two major forms of joint marketing (Kalb 1988). Co-marketing is the other form and these terms are often confused. It is made through an agreement (the co-promotion agreement) which requires a lot of collaboration between the sales and marketing organisations of both companies. One of the partners usually has a licence to exploit the product and the other partner is the originator or licensor. It helps the less developed areas of a company to be covered by the partner company's strengths and therefore to expand the share of voice in the marketplace for a product. Through co-promotion, a collaborative strategy, the consumer attraction is increased. It is a way co-exploiting products.

== Characteristics ==
Many collaborative marketing strategies are often confused. The elements that differentiate co-promotion from other marketing practices are the following:

- It is on a national basis and has a better impact on a short period.
- It is considered as a non-competitive strategy.
- It is built under one brand and the image is applied on both companies (1 brand, but 2 sales forces).
- It has an extensive coordination.
- Requirement of co-promotion is usually made by smaller companies.

Co-promotion is also known for offering high potential payment, it is the most attractive agreement type for both in and out-licensers compared to other agreements such as co-marketing. Co-promotion agreements also tend to be much more flexible because partners can decide what type of payments they prefer. For example, partners can choose either profit sharing without royalty payments or higher royalties on sales.

== The agreement ==
=== How it works ===
Companies seeking a partner identify their areas of strengths and weaknesses and agree to share promotional efforts. The owner of the product usually manufactures it and uses the other company's trademark. The profit on the sales resulting from shared promotional effort is divided according to the amount of effort made by the partners.

=== Types of agreement ===
- Standalone co-promotion deal: Case where two or more parties combines sales capabilities for promotion (tend to occur when the product is already marketed). This type of deal was applied for diphenhydramine (Allergan) by MAP Pharmaceuticals and dihydroergotamine (Levadex) in January 2011.
- Multi-component deal: Case where two or more parties anticipate the possibility of co-promoting as a consequence of R&D effort. The licensor will have an option to co-promote the product in defined territories once the product is launched (occurs at any time of development). Orexigen and Takeda Pharma collaborated to promote naltrexone/bupropion ((Contrave)) under this form of deal. This type of deal often cause problems because of issues such as inability of implementation caused by the pricing or strategies that might change.

=== Planning the agreement ===
Co-promotion agreements symbolise attractive options for the less developed companies that wants to control its product's target but these types of deal structures are much more complex than a company taking full responsibility for development and commercialisation. As a consequence, these collaboration agreements require comprehensive planning, detailed agreements and must consider a number of critical factors such as:

- Financial Modeling and Forecasting:

Sharing the product revenues and the expenses by building cost models. Covering financial factors should be done such as allocation of promotional costs and expenses, number and quality of detailing, responsibility for sales force training, and monitoring and auditing of promotion expenses.

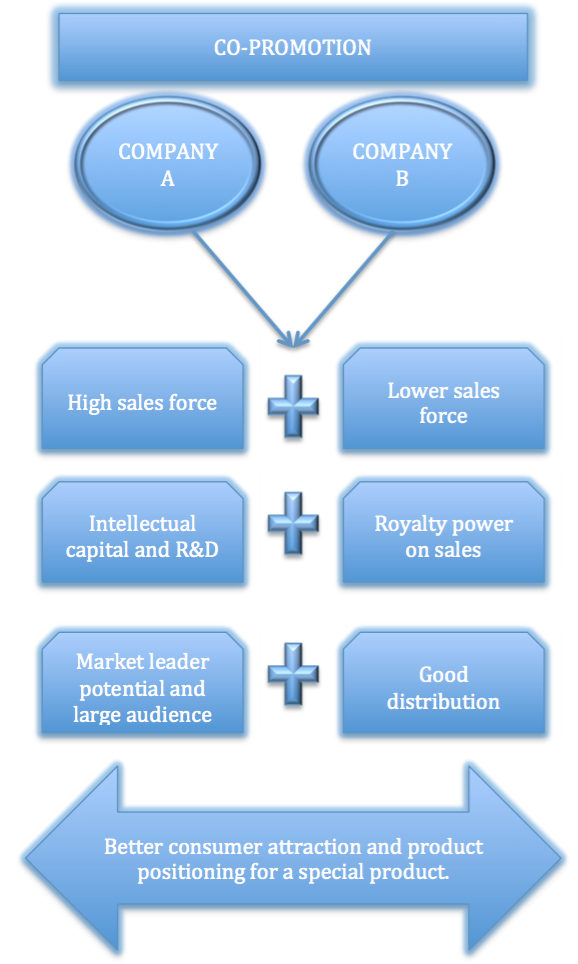
A co-promotion example created by the user who wrote the article.

- Relationship between Partner Companies:

Everyone in the company in any status such as the senior management, the board, the project managers should understand that company capital and wealth will be focused on the partnership. It is important to confirm with your partner that there is a sharing philosophy.

- Planning for a Range of Outcomes:

As with any other important business decisions, diverse situations and strategies should be evaluated, companies need to have extensive internal debates to face several principal questions: Why is this proposed deal important for the company? Where do we want this deal to take us? How does the proposed deal fit within the company's short and long-term goals?

- Alternatives:

When considering a co-promotion deal, a company should keep in mind other possible situations, to maximise long-term flexibility such as retaining co-promotion rights as an option, rather than a firm commitment.

== Cost ==
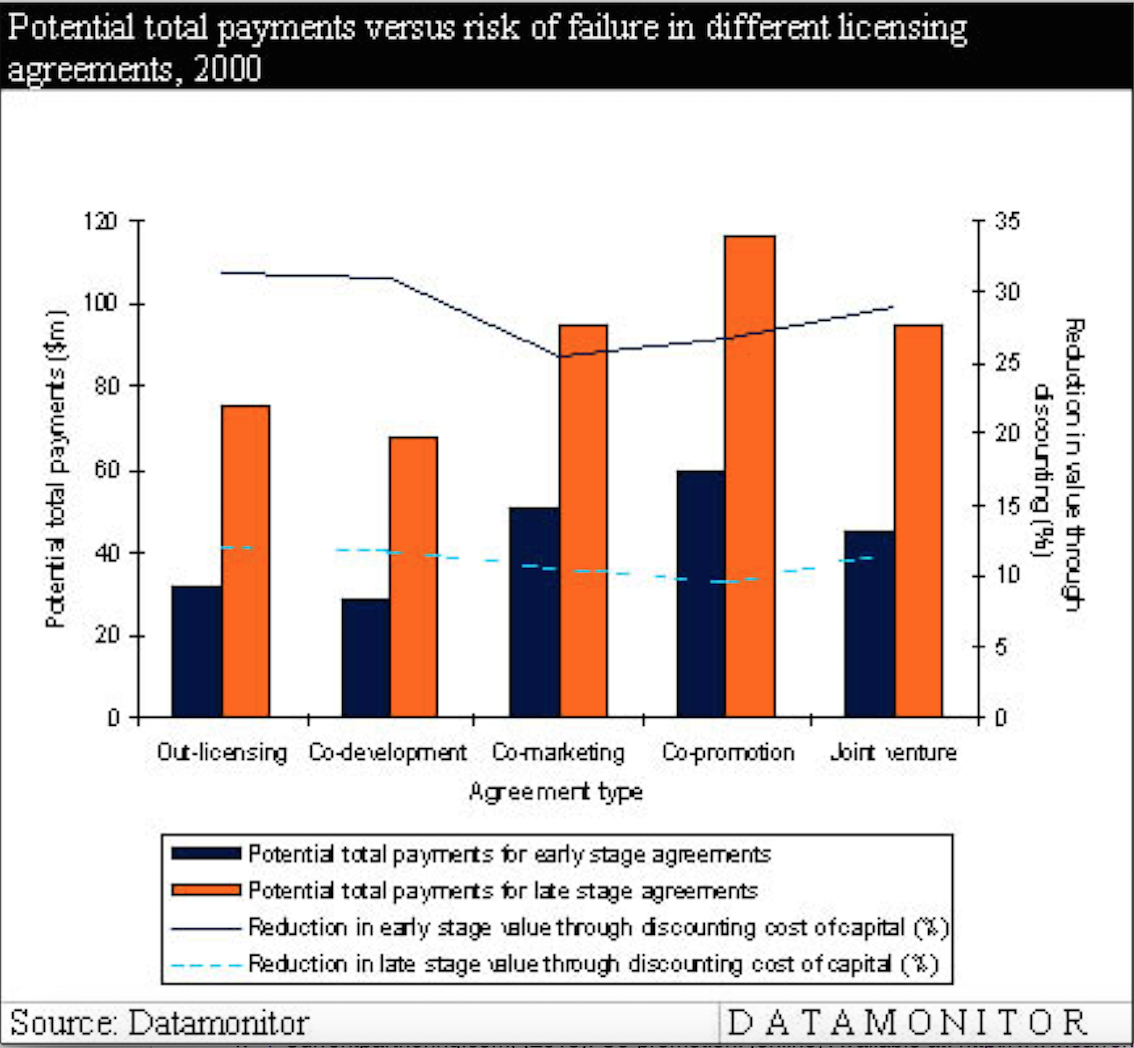
This graph represents high total payments of co-promotion agreements compared to alternative licensing types.

At the beginning stage the average up-front co-promotion payment could be up to $18m, with a potential royalty rate of 25%. At the accomplishment stage these payments has the probability to increase to $53m with a maximum average of royalty rates up to 31%. It is considered as an expensive option for in-licensers as the payments are high in contrast to co-marketing.

However, this technique provides more long-term advantages because high payments has a better possibility to expand the target with combined sales force, thus providing advantages on a long-term basis for companies.

== In the pharmaceutical industry ==
Co-promotion agreements are commonly used by pharmaceutical companies to improve the marketing and product penetration in particular countries. Since the 2000s co-promotion started to play an important role in the pharmaceutical industry.

Co-promotion plays a major role in the pharmaceutical industries because in today's market, pharma companies are in a situation of falling productivity. Accessing to new products through association with biotech companies allows pharma companies to expand their influence and guarantee their success over the market. The industry itself has a complex manufacturing and as a consequence a less competitive market. Therefore, those companies prefer to make co-promotion agreements because they can be able to have a more stable revenue stream which is strategically preferred. Co-promotion is also considered as an advantage for emerging companies in terms of capital infusions, sharing of risks for product development and for regulatory or commercialisation expertise.

While it has been usual for biotech firms to receive between 5%and 10% of the revenues incurred in mutual projects, this number has grown in some cases to around 50% (Zanetti and Steiner 2001).

=== A specific example ===
Merck and Agensys had an agreement in order to promote a cancer drug, it has cost $17.5 million in upfront payments and up to $11.5 million over the next year in milestone payments to develop the AGS-PSCA drug for prostate cancer. In this agreement Merck will have the responsibility for commercial manufacture and worldwide clinical development while Agensys will have equal participation in these developments. In addition, Agensys will work on providing a cancer treatment drug at an earlier stage with a smaller chance of risk through milestone payments. The development sharing will help both companies to be more productive.

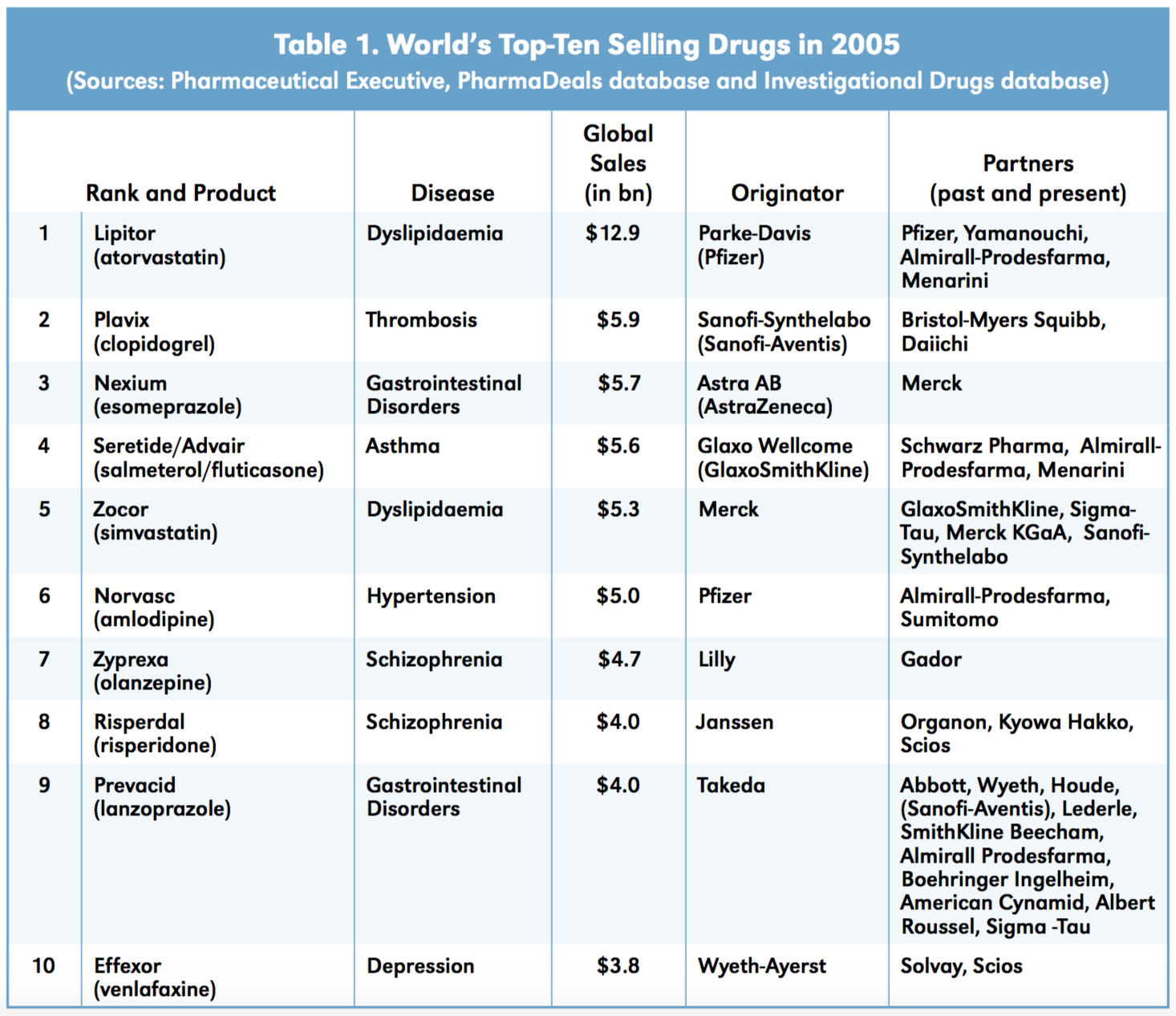
Top selling drugs in 2015

=== Other examples ===
1. Exelixis in collaboration with GlaxoSmith-Kline (helped to be positioned ad number 2 in the U.S)
2. Genta in collaboration with Aventis
3. Monsanto with Pfizer for Celebex (total upfront payment of $85 million)
4. Neurocrine in collaboration with Pfizer
5. Warner-Lambert and Pfizer for Lipitor
6. Glaxo-SmithKline and Janssen for Paxil
7. Pharmacia & Upjohn (now part of Pfizer) and Janssen Pharmaceuticals to co-promote Pharmacia's antidepressant Vestra the agreement recovered 27% of the company's total first-half revenues ($6.2 billion), and 44 percent of its total pharmaceutical sales ($3.7 billion). For Pfizer case the agreement was 18% of the company's revenues ($4.4 billion) and totalled $777 million for the first half of 1999.

== In other industries ==
Co-promotion is also used in other industries. Prominent partnership deals include:

1. The deal between General Motors and Toyota for manufacturing cars
2. Siemens and Philips for semiconductors
3. Canon and Kodak for photocopiers
4. Citibank and Thai Airways
