= Marketing channel =

Resources for getting products to the consumer

A marketing channel consists of the people, organizations, and activities necessary to transfer the ownership of goods from the point of production to the point of consumption. It is the way products get to the end-user, the consumer; and is also known as a distribution channel. A marketing channel is a useful tool for management, and is crucial to create an effective and well-planned marketing strategy.

Another less known form of the marketing channel is the dual distribution channel. This channel is a less traditional form that allows the manufacturer or wholesaler to reach the end-user by using more than one distribution channel. The producer can simultaneously reach the consumer through a direct market, such as a website, or sell to another company or retailer that will reach the consumer through another channel, i.e., a store. An example of this type of channel would be franchising.

The role of marketing channels in marketing strategies

- Links producers to buyers.
- Influences the firm's pricing strategy.
- Affecting product strategy through branding, policies, willingness to stock.
- Customizes profits, installs, maintains, offers credit, etc.

== Types ==
There are four main types of marketing channels.

=== Producer → Customer (Zero-level Channel) ===
The producer sells the goods or provides the service directly to the consumer with no involvement with a middle man such as an intermediary, a wholesaler, a retailer, an agent, or a reseller. The consumer goes directly to the producer to buy the product without going through any other channel. This type of marketing is most beneficial to farmers who can set the prices of their products without having to go through the Canadian Federation of Agriculture. Typically, goods that are consumed by a smaller segment of the market have influence over producers and, therefore, goods that are produced in response to the orders of a few consumers are taken into account. Normally goods and services from this channel are not utilized by large market segments. Moreover, the price of the goods may be subject to significant fluctuations. For example, high demand dictates an increase in the price.

In addition, this particular channel has three main ways of direct selling and these include; peddling, mail-order sales and trade through manufacturer-owned stores. Peddling is an outdated version of trade between two parties and consignments are often sold in small amounts by sellers who are traveling to different places. For example, sales representative sells New Wave cosmetics to housewives by using a method of peddling. Mail-order sales are usually used to sell catalogs, books etc., except industrial and bulky goods. For example, a firm sells collectibles through the use of mail-order. This method of selling is normally made without eye contact.

In the last method (manufacture-owned stores), the manufacturer itself is surrounded by the stores and directly supplies goods to its stores. For example, Singer sells its sewing machines through its own stores. Due to distance of goods and products between producer and a seller, it takes an advantage to be an effective channel of distribution in its kind and these advantages are; producers pay close attention with customers and are aware of theirs' thought's and ideas that are shared with them, there are no intermediaries that could substantially reduce the profit of a company which would then result in significant loss and delivery time is shortened due to having no obstacles like middleman etc. Despite these apparent advantages, direct selling has not become a powerful channel. According to an estimate, even less than 3 percent of total consumers’ sales are made in this channel.

On the other hand, technological innovations, the aid of the internet and convenient smartphones are now changing the way that commerce works significantly. The proliferation of internet-direct channels means that internet companies will be able to produce and directly trade services and goods with consumers. It can be distributed directly through the internet, for example, services in the sphere of gambling or software such as antivirus programs as such.

=== Producer → Retailer → Consumer (One-level Channel) ===
Retailers like Walmart and Target, buy the product from the manufacturer and sell them directly to the consumer. This channel is most often used by manufacturers that produce shopping goods like clothes, shoes, furniture, tableware, and toys. Since consumers need more time with these types of items before they decide to purchase them, the manufacturer will sell them to an intermediary before it gets into the hands of the consumers.

Using an established network that already has brand loyalty is a good strategy to use for producers to get the product to the end-user rapidly. Depending on the form of the retail property, operators can be an independent company, owned by various owners or to engage in the retail network. Intermediaries (retail service) are useful due to their experience, professionalism, ability to offer products to the target market, and connections in the industry, as well as advantages in specialization and high quality of work. In other words, manufacturers produce large quantity of goods and products but are limited in its assortment and merchandise. Consumers seek a wider variety in lesser quantities. Therefore, it is highly essential to distribute goods from different manufacturers to suit consumers needs and wants. When creating a retail store, buyer effort when making a purchase is considered. For example, stores that sell everyday consumer goods are conveniently located in a nearby neighbourhood for residents. The speed and convenience of service for clients’ interests are put in high priority.

An equally important component of the retail trade is the retail function that play crucial roles. These include research of products, implementation of storage, setting of pricing policy, arrangements of products and its selection for the creation of different merchandise assortments, exploration of the condition prevailing in the market. This channel is considered to be beneficial if the volume of pre-sale and post-sale is insignificant, the amount of segments of the market is not enormous, and the assortment of goods and products is broad. Ultimately, the significance of intermediaries in distribution business is vital as they help consumers obtain particular goods of a specific brand without unnecessary steps. Thus, mediators play a crucial role in establishing a correspondence between demand and supply.

=== Producer → Wholesaler → Retailer → Customer (Two-level Channel) ===
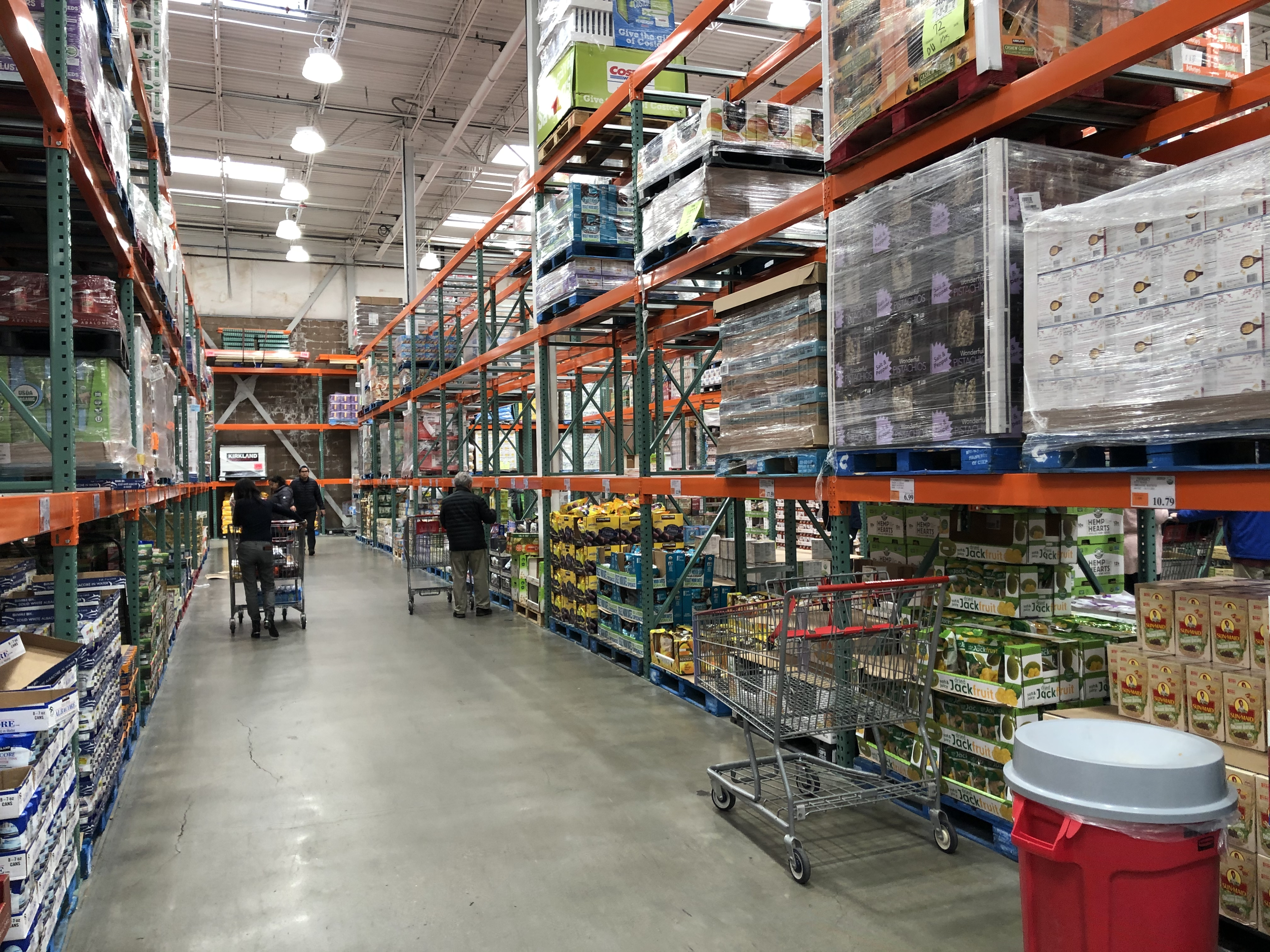
Shelves in a wholesaler warehouse. Customers are able to purchase products in bulk.

Wholesalers buy the products from the manufacturer and sell them to the consumer. In this channel, consumers can buy products directly from the wholesaler in bulk. By purchasing the items in bulk from the wholesaler, the prices of the goods are reduced. This is because the wholesaler takes away extra costs, such as service costs or sales force costs, that customers usually pay when buying from retail; making the price much cheaper for the consumer.

However, the wholesaler does not always sell directly to the consumer. Sometimes the wholesaler will go through a retailer before the product gets into the hands of the consumer. Each dealer (the manufacturer, the wholesaler, and the retailer) will be looking to make a decent profit margin from the product. Hence, each time the buyer purchases the merchandise from another source, the price of the product has to increase, in order to maximize the profit each person will receive. This raises the price of the product for the end-user.

Due to the simultaneous and joint work of wholesaler and retailer, a trade can only be beneficial if a market is situated on a large area and the supply of goods is carried out small but urgent consignments (products), it can be cost-effective and profitable by supplying significant consignments (products) to fewer customers. Industrial factories want to utilize the advantages of mass production to produce and sell big lots (batches) while retailers look and prefer purchasing smaller consignments. This method for factories could lead to instant sales, high efficiency, and cost-effectiveness. Therefore, particularly in these situations, wholesaler now plays a role where it reconciles these contradictory aspirations.

The wholesaler purchases big lots and resells them to retailers in smaller lots. The transportation of products become less burdensome because the amount of delivered goods diminishes through the use of this channel (the wholesale). For example, if five manufacturers supply goods directly to a hundred different retail stores, then they will have to have 500 of deliveries (5 times 100). However, if those five manufacturers supply to the same wholesaler, and the wholesaler at this stage provides 100 different retailers, then the total number of deliveries will decrease to 105 (5 plus 100).

Another important component to consider in the practice of wholesaling is storage. Storage of goods is another work aspect of a wholesaler. Wholesaler regulates the deliveries of goods, having synchronised the production and consumption of material goods. Moreover, the wholesaler, further assumes the financial obligations related to the immobilisation of funds invested in the creation of commodity stocks. Although the chain of transition suggests that the wholesaler directly communicates and deals with a manufacturer may not be unambiguous. The contribution of a distributor is highly acknowledged and plays a crucial role in distributing flows of goods before it gets in the hands of wholesalers, retailers and so on.

A distributor is the representative of the manufacturer and performs functions on behalf of the manufacturer for the distribution of goods from producer to wholesaler or retailer. A distributor is always on the look out for orders from different clients and actively promotes producer's products and services. The main tasks of a distributor are to study the market and the creation of databases of consumers, advertising of goods, an organization of services for the delivery of goods, stocking up the inventory levels, the creation of a stable sales network, which includes dealers and other intermediaries, depending on the market situation. Distributors scarcely sell a manufacturer's goods directly to customers.

=== Producer → Agent/Broker → Wholesaler or Retailer → Customer (Three-level Channel) ===
This distribution channel involves more than one intermediary before the product gets into the hands of the consumer. The middleman, known as the agent, assists with the negotiation between the manufacturer and the seller. Agents come into play when the producers need to get their product into the market as quickly as possible. This happens mostly when the item is perishable and has to get to the market fresh before it starts to rot.

At times, the agent will directly go to the retailer with the goods, or take an alternate route through the wholesaler who will go to a retailer and then finally to the consumer. A mutual cooperation normally occurs when parties, in particular, the last channel of marketing chain of distribution meet, due to the fact that producers, agents, retailers/wholesalers and consumers of this channel aid each other and benefit from each other. Their cooperation generates a greater output in terms of further profitability, by discernment and exploring newer markets of sales, and building a better business relationship. The participants of distribution channels must have knowledge and experience not only for the effective maintenance of target segments but also to maintain the competitive advantage of the manufacturer. For example, an agent who is able to vary prices for certain products can negotiate and or lower prices. This will assist him in sustaining the comparative advantage, remain on top of its competitors and fulfil market demand. A broker works mainly to bring the seller and the buyer together, and to assist in the negotiation process.

An intermediary like broker is usually dependent on the commission of a sold product or production in terms of goods, and also is involved in one-off transactions and can not be an effective channel of distribution. However, he can maintain a competitive advantage over other firms in the form of a particular brand if he has obtained the right to exclusively represent the manufacturer, and earn profit. He acts on behalf of the seller (producer or manufacturer) and has no rights to modify prices for products. Besides, having formed a channel of distribution, it is important to remember that the exploitation and utilization of intermediaries in a business (not only wholesalers, retailers but also transport logistics) will lengthen the chain of distribution. A business will then need to consider which channel is more cost-effective and productive in terms of timely delivery, efficiency, pricing policy, and where it stands among competitors; for example, overall feedback, higher rating, and higher demand from customers. The best use and help of intermediaries can be applied to start-up businesses and perhaps an established business.

== Channel marketing ==
Brands involved in selling through marketing channels (also commonly known as distribution channels) have relationships with the channel partners (local resellers, retailers, field agents, etc.) that sell their products or services to the end customer. Brands that aim to maximize sales through channel partners provide them with advertising and promotional support that is pre-configured and often subsidized by the brand.

=== Coordinated channel marketing ===
Brands carry out online and offline advertising on behalf of channel partners to aid them in generating sales of their branded products. Those online and offline marketing initiatives can either be isolated or coordinated to inform one another.

An example of this is an apple orchard: Apple orchard > Transport > Processing factory > Packaging > Final product to be sold > Apple pie eaten

An alternative term is distribution channel or 'route-to-market'. It is a 'path' or 'pipeline' through which goods and services flow in one direction (from vendor to the consumer), and the payments generated by them flow in the opposite direction (from consumer to the vendor). A marketing channel can be as short as being direct from the vendor to the consumer or may include several inter-connected (usually independent but mutually dependent) intermediaries such as wholesalers, distributors, agents, retailers. Each intermediary receives the item at one pricing point and moves it to the next higher pricing point until it reaches the final buyer.

Marketing Channels can be long term or short term.

Short term channels are influenced by market factors such as: business users, geographically concentrated, extensive technical knowledge and regular servicing required, and large orders. Short term product are influenced by factors such as: perishable, complex, and expensive. Short term producer factors include whether the manufacturer has adequate resources to perform channel functions, Broad product line, and channel control is important. Short term competitive factors include: manufacturing feels satisfied with marketing intermediaries' performance in promoting products.

Long term market factors include consumers, geographically dispersed, little technical knowledge and regular servicing is not required, and small orders. Product factors for long term marketing channels are: durable, standardized, and inexpensive. Producer factors are manufacturer lacks adequate resources to perform channel functions, limited product line, and channel control not important. The competitive factors are: manufacturer feels dissatisfied with marketing intermediaries' performance in promoting products

=== Differentiation channel marketing ===
There are three channel marketing approaches:

- Multichannel marketing
- Omnichannel marketing
- Crosschannel marketing

These approaches can be differentiated by:

- Where they take place (on which channels)
- The differentiation of customer data which are used and how campaigns will be set up
- The marketing approach
- The main goal
