= Aric Rindfleisch =

American academic and author

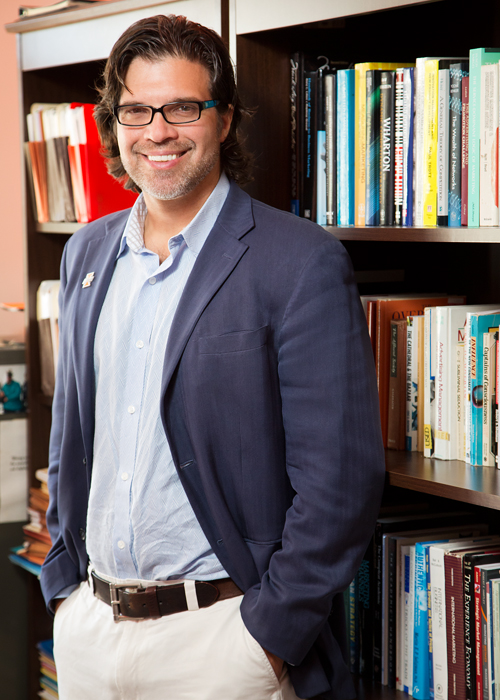
- Born: 28 October 1965 (age 60); Farmington, Connecticut, United States of America
- Other name: A. Rindfleisch
- Education: University of Wisconsin–Madison, PhD, 1998; Cornell University, MBA, 1990; Central Connecticut State University, BS, 1987
- Occupation: Professor of marketing.

Aric Rindfleisch (born 28 October 1965) is an American marketing author and professor. He is the Executive Director of the Illinois MakerLab at the University of Illinois at Urbana–Champaign, and John M. Jones Professor of Marketing. He was included in "The Best 300 Professors" list compiled by The Princeton Review in 2012.

Rindfleisch is a former executive at the advertising agency J. Walter Thompson. In 2015, he started a course on digital marketing at Coursera. He also served as an officer in the US Army Reserve for 14 years.

== Career ==
=== Research ===
His research has focused on brand loyalty and materialism. With two colleagues, Aric conducted a 2006 study that established the concept of the doppelganger brand image. He is also known for promoting advanced technologies like 3D printing.

His current research focuses on collaborative innovation, customer co-creation, and the maker movement. Over the past three years, he has been involved in the 3D printing community and built an early MakerBot Cupcake in 2010.

=== Teaching ===
Rindfleisch teaches two courses in the iMBA program offered by the Gies College of Business at the University of Illinois at Urbana-Champaign and is also the instructor for an online course, "Marketing in a Digital World", offered by Coursera and the University of Illinois at Urbana-Champaign. The course has had over 250,000 Learners, and was rated by Class Central as one of the Top 50 MOOCs of All Time in 2016.

== Publications ==
- Rindfleisch, A., O'Hern, M., Sachdev, V. 2017. The Digital Revolution, 3D Printing, and Innovation as Data. Journal of Product Innovation Management, 34: 681-690
- Mahr, D., Rindfleisch, A., Slotegraaf, R. 2015. Enhancing Crowdsourcing Success: The Role of Creative and Deliberate Problem-Solving Styles. Customer Needs and Solutions, 209-221
- Wuyts, S., Rindfleisch, A., Citrin, A. 2015. Outsourcing Customer Support: The Role of Provider Customer Focus. Journal of Operations Management, 35: 40-55.

== Honors and awards ==
- List of Teachers Ranked as Excellent, University of Illinois, 2014, 2016.
- He was named by Princeton Review as one of “The Best 300 Professors” in America.
- Vernon Zimmerman Faculty Fellow, University of Illinois at Urbana-Champaign, 2019-2024
- Teaching and Learning Faculty Innovation Scholar, University of Illinois at Urbana-Champaign, 2023
- Excellence in Online & Distance Teaching, University of Illinois at Urbana-Champaign, 2022
- Vithala R. Rao Award, Customer Needs and Solutions, 2022
