= Relationship substance framework =

Conceptual model describing the structure of business-to-business relationships

- Field: Business-to-business marketing; Industrial marketing
- Origin: Developed by the IMP Group
- Key people: Håkan Håkansson; Ivan Snehota; Lars-Gunnar Gadde
- Purpose: Understanding B2B relationships through actor bonds, resource ties, and activity links

The relationship substance framework is a conceptual model for understanding business-to-business (B2B) relationships, developed and championed by the Industrial Marketing and Purchasing Group (IMP Group) and adopted particularly in Scandinavian studies of industrial practice. The IMP Group have proposed that all business relationships are made up of three layers - actor bonds, resource ties and activity links.

These may be defined as follows:

- Actor bonds: factors which connect actors - 'the buyer', 'the seller' - and influence how they perceive each other and form their identities in relation to each other;
- Resource ties: connections between the various resource elements (technological, material, knowledge resources and other intangibles) of two companies, which result from how the B2B relationship has developed and themselves become a resource for each company arising from their investment in their commercial relationship;
- Activity links: technical, administrative, commercial and other activities which operate within one company and may be connected in various ways to the activities of another company as a relationship develops.

The interaction between these three layers is described by Håkansson and Snehota:

"Actors activate resources by carrying out activities; the availability of resources limits the range of activities that a firm's actors may pursue; and actors may only actively and purposefully develop activity links and resource ties if there are bonds between other actors and themselves".

Gadde and Snehota presented the model in 2000 in terms of intensity across the three dimensions:

- How tightly coordinated are firms' activity ties?
- How well adapted are the resources of one company to the requirements of their counterpart?
- How intensely do the individuals in the companies interact?

== Commentary ==
The Chartered Institute of Procurement & Supply refers to the framework in the material to be studied for its Diploma in Procurement and Supply qualification.

Myhal et al. suggested in 2001 that this framework required further development: "[W]hile the relationship substance framework appears to provide a suitable basis of classification for the various relationship quality components in business relationships ... further work was needed in order to assess the full nature of relationship quality".
