= Alexandra Waluszewski =

Swedish business theorist (born 1956)

Alexandra Waluszewski (born 1956) is a Swedish organizational theorist, Professor at the Department of Economic History of the Uppsala University, particularly known for her work with Håkan Håkansson on "Managing Technological Development" and "Knowledge and innovation in business and industry."

== Life and work ==
In 1983 Waluszewski obtained her BS in Business Studies at the University of Uppsala, where in 1989 she also obtained her PhD in Business Studies with the thesis, entitled "Framväxten av en ny mekanisk massateknik - en utvecklingshistoria" (The Emergence of a New Mechanical Pulping Technique—A Development Story) under guidance of Håkan Håkansson.

Waluszewski serves her academic career at the Uppsala University, where she was appointed Associate Professor in Industrial Marketing in 1997. In 2008 she is appointed Professor at the Department of Economic History of the Uppsala University. She is also Research Director of the Universities program entitled Uppsala Science, Technology Business.

Waluszewski research interest focussed on the question "how knowledge and technology is developed and utilized in business and industry, as well as how the understanding of these processes." In 2010 she is elected member of the Royal Swedish Academy of Engineering Sciences, and she is affiliated with the Industrial Marketing and Purchasing Group.

== Selected publications ==
- Håkansson, H., and Alexandra Waluszewski. Managing Technological Development. IKEA, the environment and technology" (2002).
- Waluszewski, Alexandra, D. Harrison, and H. Håkansson. Rethinking marketing: Developing a new understanding of markets. John Wiley and Sons Ltd, 2004.
- Håkansson, Håkan, and Alexandra Waluszewski, eds. Knowledge and innovation in business and industry: The importance of using others. Routledge, 2007.
- Håkansson, H., Ford, D., Gadde, L. E., Snehota, I., & Waluszewski, A. (2009). Business in networks. John Wiley & Sons,.

Articles, a selection

- Håkansson, Håkan, and Alexandra Waluszewski. "Path dependence: restricting or facilitating technical development?." Journal of Business Research 55.7 (2002): 561-570.
- Waluszewski, Alexandra. "A competing or co-operating cluster or seven decades of combinatory resources? What's behind a prospering biotech valley?." Scandinavian Journal of Management 20.1 (2004): 125-150.
- Harrison, Debbie, and Alexandra Waluszewski. "The development of a user network as a way to re-launch an unwanted product." Research Policy 37.1 (2008): 115-130.
