= Account-based selling =

Strategic sales model

Account-based selling, also known as account-based sales and hyper-segmented sales, is a strategic sales model in which the sale of goods or services is carried out to narrow segments of the target audience or specific decision makers. In a typical ABS concept, the selling company forms a target audience, then divides it into narrow segments to offline selling.

== History ==
Emerged in the mid-2010s as a further development of account-based marketing (ABM) strategy, hyper-segmented sales are considered one of the youngest strategies. Research and consulting company Gartner projected that from 2020 ABS would be the basis of sales for most technology vendors, and that the volume of this market would exceed $5 billion per year. The ABS concept was developed for use in the B2B industry.

== Differences from account-based marketing ==
Broad industry marketing is not targeted enough to attract the right segment of the target audience. The account-based marketing (ABM) strategy is managed by the marketing department and has a number of limitations. For example, corporate transactions often involve several decision makers, and presentation materials must be prepared for each of them. Contact provided by ABM strategy does not guarantee the continuation of business negotiations. Implementation of ABM strategy provides for lead generation in offline sales, while ABS strategy aims to provide for transformation of leads into sales.

ABS strategy implies teamwork of all departments involved in sales of goods or services, primarily sales and marketing departments. Instead of traditional scenario and template work, ABS departments adapt their activities to specific microsegments of the target audience, focusing on personalized interaction with multiple stakeholders. This is not a quantitative approach, but a qualitative one, which considers each microsegment of the target audience as a market.

The goal of ABS is to bridge the gap between marketing and sales departments.

== See also ==
- Customer relationship management
- Account-based marketing
