= Islamic marketing =

Selling in accord with Islamic principles

Islamic marketing is a process of attempting to sell a product or service to customers and other stakeholders while keeping this process in accord with the principles of Islamic transaction. This includes maintaining halal for the products or services being marketed.

Islamic marketing can be defined as a process of value creation; that is, a process of making a product or service attractive to potential consumers. This is achieved by socially interacting with stakeholders to increase a product’s value, adding symbolic meanings, and improving access to types of supply chains. Value creation can also target the general public or specific communities.

Value creation happens at three levels: transactions, multi-level exchanges, marketing-systems. Such value creation must be in accord with the principles of Islamic transaction.

The global Islamic economy, defined as “sectors comprising core products/services that are structurally affected by Islamic ethics and law" was valued in 2019 at $2.02 trillion of consumer spending by 1.9 billion Muslims across six real-economy sectors, according to the 2020-21 State of the Global Islamic Economy Report.

== History ==
The history of business in Islam began with Muhammad and his wife Khadijah, who were merchants. The Sharia law derived particularly from the Quran and Hadith deals with banking, business, economics, politics, and contracts. Since the early days of Islamic history, Muslim business producers had to follow the rules and requirements of Islamic Sharia when conducting production and marketing activities. The focus on ethics in Islamic marketing resulted in early Arabian merchants converting to Islam.

Since 2000, the importance of the Muslim market has begun to appear in consultancy reports for Western multinational corporations. Some research has been done on consumption practices of Muslims as well as implications of Islamic ethics on marketing practices, but as of 2011 scholarly literature on the subject had not been published. On 29 and 30 November 2010, the first International Conference on Islamic Marketing and Branding was held in Kuala Lumpur, Malaysia. The Journal of Islamic Marketing was launched in 2010.

== Principles ==
There are five principles of Islamic transaction:

- Minimize harm and maximize benefit
- Riba is a non-transaction.
- Value is to be created through tangible effort.
- Mutual consent is the main condition of trade.
- Marketing activity must minimize the likelihood of post-transaction dispute.

These sources emphasize the importance of human well-being and good life, religious brotherhood and sisterhood, socioeconomic justice, and a balanced satisfaction of both the material and the spiritual. Islamic marketing ethics aims at maximizing equity and justice by inhibiting customer exploitation and avoiding dishonesty, fraud and deceit in business. Any unethical actions will do injustice and go against brotherhood and equality of humanity, which form the core of Islamic vision.

The application of ihsan can strengthen relationships with customers and communities, which may improve a firm's public image and lead to further profit.

== Application ==
Islamic marketing does not allow for the sale of certain goods and services:

- Production and sales that are considered unclean is forbidden. This include marketing of things like alcohol or gambling.
- Adulteration with something concealed in the sale and purchase is forbidden. This means it is forbidden to omit and fabricate the quality and quantity of products.
- Sales and marketing of instruments meant for prohibited acts (entertainment, gambling) are forbidden.
- Sales and marketing of weapons to the enemies of Islamic faith, or to anyone using them for war against Muslims.
- Drawing pictures of human beings or animals in stone, wood, metal, or any other concrete form is forbidden.
- Performance of magic, as well as learning and teaching it, is forbidden.

Studies suggest that Muslim customers consider five factors that must be emphasized by businesses when conducting Islamic marketing:

- Commitment: assurance in business dealings via trustworthy marketing activities.
- Characteristic: distinct and unique elements of product design and promotion in line with Islamic values and characteristics.
- Conformity: compliance in creating and delivering the product and services with Islamic laws
- Conscience: ethical dimensions of Islamic marketing, that are in line with Islamic value.
- Customer-centric: customer-focused to provide the best experience to the customer.

== Macromarketing ==
Islamic macromarketing focuses on reformed marketing systems whose mechanisms are based on Islamic values and principles, and which aim to minimise long-term harm and maximise welfare for both Muslim and non-Muslim populations. It must enable lifestyles which are beneficial to an individual, rather than promoting lifestyles which involve material pursuit or excessive consumption, as those might cause long-term harm. Islamic macromarketing allows Muslims to consider how marketing practices can improve living standards, community well-being, healthcare outcomes, educational institutions, and societal justice.

== Challenges ==
Islamic marketing may face challenges in countries with free markets, which may focus on profit maximization. Another potential issue is that Islam may be oversimplified and reduced to purely a marketing tool. Thirdly, sacralisation of Islam can occur which will reduce tolerance and hamper the acceptance and growth of critique.

== See also ==
- Oxford Global Islamic Branding and Marketing Forum
