= New business development =

New business development concerns all the activities involved in the creation of a new enterprise and in realizing new business opportunities, including product or service design, business model design, and marketing.

== Overview ==
In traditional business development, growing an enterprise involves a variety of techniques that primarily fall within the scope of marketing. A central focus is how to identify, reach, and engage customers while ensuring their satisfaction, potentially through new products. When supplying a solution, it is important to focus on the total offering you give instead of only focusing on the product or service. An offering is a package consisting of different proportions of physical product, service, advice, delivery and the costs, including price that are involved in using it. Hereby the advice, adaptation to the customer and the costs are the most important factors to get the right combination within the offering.

Drawing on contingency theory, an idea central to new business development is that different product-market- technology combinations can require different marketing strategies and business models to make them a success. To chart the factors that are involved and create synergy between them, new business development draws heavily upon the fields of technology and business networks. The new business development process is to recognize chances and opportunities in a fast changing technological environment. Often uncertainty arises because of new technology and their new markets.

== Technology of business ==
Innovative technology provides important opportunities for new business development. To stay competitive, companies must keep products and processes up to date. Continuous investment in innovation for both products and processes makes it more difficult for others to offer a large technological functionality advantage. Many companies need technological development to stay competitive. Technological development can occur through making decisions about acquiring, exploiting and managing technologies. These decisions should be made by involving the research and development staff, purchasing staff and marketers. The customers are also important.

Furthermore, technology can be analyzed by the concept/framework of value configuration as introduced by Norwegian academics Stabell and Fjedstad in 1998. The framework consists of three value configurations, which are an extension of the value chain model developed by Michael Porter:

- the value chain (transformation of inputs in products),
- the value shop (solving customer problems), and
- the value network (linking customers).

These configurations overcome some of the issues with the traditional value chain model, which is only helpful for traditional manufacturing companies. In practice, firms are not pure instances of a single distinct value configuration, multiple combinations of configurations can be found within one firm.

The value creation process can also be understood from the perspective of Schilling. Schilling talks about value in the sense of technological functionality, installed base and complementary goods of a product. It may be clear that technology plays an important role in this value creation process, and in general contributes to the process of renewing the match between problem and solution.

== Business networks ==
Traditional marketing is usually based on economic models. In those pure economic models there is no room for negotiations or special treatment for different companies. A technological environment, however, can be very uncertain and therefore competitors have to rely heavily on their business networks. It is then that special treatments and negotiations are necessary.

It is important to recognize the effect social relations have on economic action, including business development. Granovetter also argues that social relations in a network lead to trust between partners, an important factor for stable development in a dynamic environment. By focusing on these new activities, it becomes difficult to keep every activity up-to-date and to maintain the competitive advantage. Companies therefore increasingly concentrate their investment and their activities on only a few activities which they believe to be their core business, otherwise their competitive advantage is easily lost. Because they concentrate on just a few activities, they need business relations for the other activities.

Relationships are usually based on resource ties, activity links and/or actor bonds. A company should therefore analyze their firm itself, their relationships and their business networks in terms of activities, actors and resources. In this way, a company can determine where there are new opportunities for relationships and where resources, technologies and/or skills can be developed, integrated or exploited from other companies. In this way, business development can be established with help of this business network.

Nowadays, marketing is about the exchange of heterogeneous resources between dynamic, cooperating partners in network-like structures. It is about relationships, not about selling products. So, business marketers should be busy finding, developing and managing of relationships within the complex network that surrounds them. Blois provides three ways in which a firm can evolve from market to network mechanism. These are entrepreneurial alertness (being alert to value-creating opportunities), path dependence (historical events cause solutions to problems and become “locked in”) and replaceability (irreplaceable contributors get much attention of others trying to influence them).

It is still questionable to what extent these networks are involved by social relations, since the mentioned authors do not agree on this. Therefore, enterprises have to cope with the problem of how to maintain their network contacts.

== Costs and cash flow ==
Cost pressures and cash flow concerns, in the sense of having sufficient cash and liquid assets to be able to meet current costs, are important factors influencing the pace of new business development, and may impact on the opportunities which can be accessed. Byron Dixon, CEO of a small business, recalled that "when we start businesses, being skint in the early days is tough, and every day is a struggle". He notes, as an example, that "the biggest kids' footwear retailer in the UK is Clarks, and that is one of the only companies that we don't deal with now because, at the time, I couldn't afford to drive to its offices, which today seems bizarre".
