= Anna Dubois =

Swedish organizational theorist (born 1962)

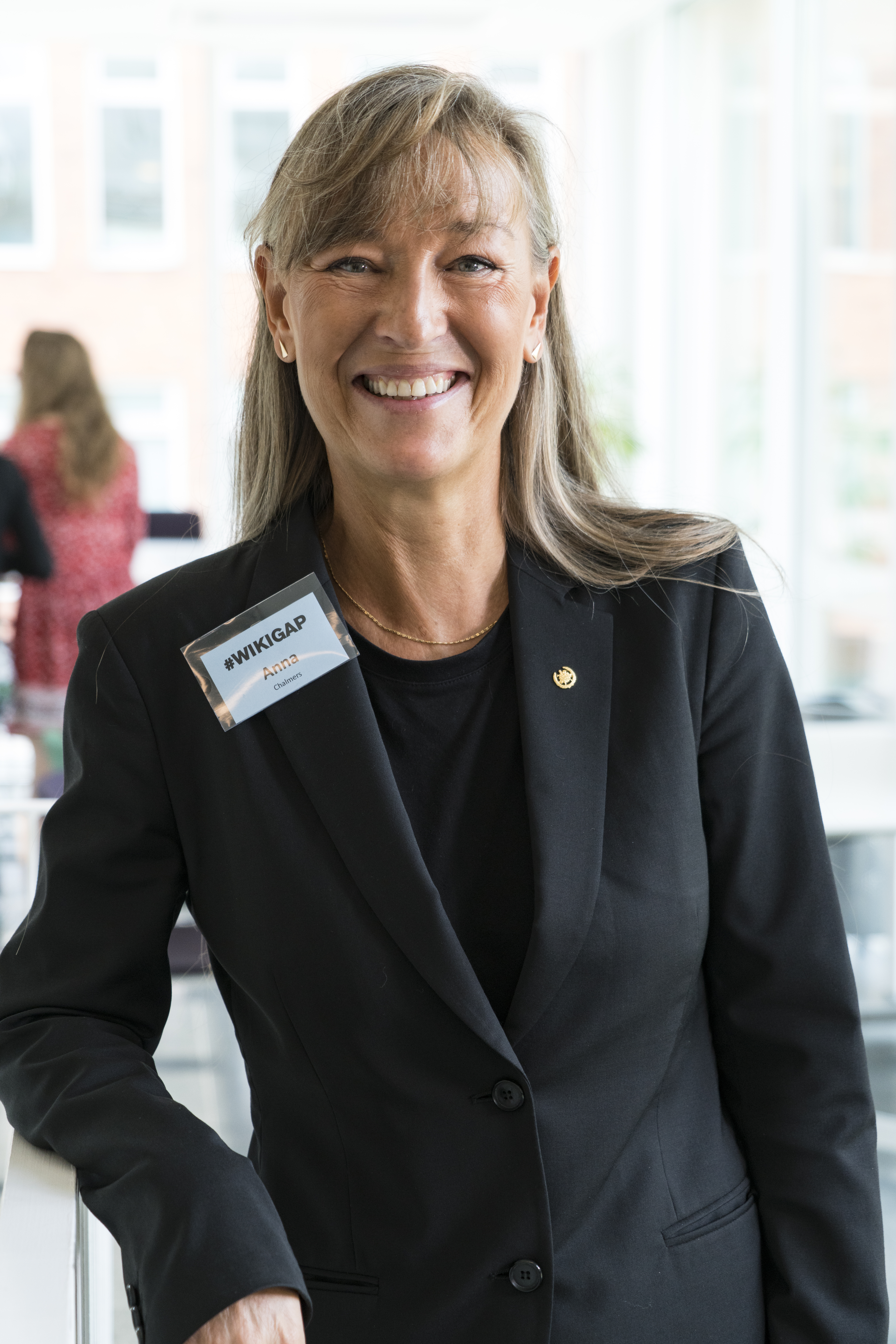
Anna Dubois, vice rector at Chalmers University of Technology, 2018

Anna Dubois (born April 20, 1962) is a Swedish organizational theorist and professor of technology management and economics at Chalmers University of Technology in Gothenburg, and director of Chalmers Transport Area of Advance. She is best known for her work with Lars-Erik Gadde on case study research, boundaries of the firm, and managing suppliers interfaces.

== Biography ==
Dubois obtained her M.Sc. in mechanical engineering at Chalmers University of Technology with a specialisation in industrial organisation in 1987. At Chalmer's Division of Industrial Marketing, she obtained her licentiate of technology in 1990, and her PhD in 1994 with the thesis, entitled "Organising Industrial Activities — An analytical framework" under guidance of Håkan Håkansson.

Dubois spends her academic career at Chalmers University of Technology. After her graduation, she started in 1995 as assistant professor in the Division of Industrial Marketing, where in 2000 she got promoted associate professor and in 2004 full professor. From 2000 to 2006 she also chaired the Division of Industrial Marketing. In 2006, she moved to the Department of Technology Management and Economics, which she chaired a year, and where she is full professor of industrial marketing and purchasing since 2007. From 2007 to 2010, she was vice president of Chalmers University of Technology, and since 2010 she is also director of Chalmers Transport Area of Advance.

Dubois has been visiting professor and/or lectured at Uppsala University, Sweden; in Norway at the Norwegian University of Science and Technology, Norwegian School of Economics and Business Administration, BI Norwegian School of Management and Molde University College; in Finland at the Aalto University; in Britain at Cambridge University and the University College Dublin; and in The Netherlands at the Eindhoven University of Technology. Since the new millennium, she participates in the Industrial Marketing and Purchasing Group.

She became a member of the Royal Society of Arts and Sciences in Gothenburg in 2009 and of the Royal Swedish Academy of Engineering Sciences in 2015.

== Selected publications ==
- Dubois, Anna. Organising Industrial Activities - An Analytical Framework. PhD thesis, Chalmers University of Technology, 1994.
- Dubois, Anna. Organizing industrial activities across firm boundaries. Routledge, 2006.

Articles, a selection

- Araujo, Luis, Anna Dubois, and Lars-Erik Gadde. "Managing interfaces with suppliers." Industrial marketing management 28.5 (1999): 497-506.
- Dubois, Anna, and Lars-Erik Gadde. "Supply strategy and network effects—purchasing behaviour in the construction industry." European Journal of Purchasing & Supply Management 6.3 (2000): 207-215.
- Dubois, Anna, and Lars-Erik Gadde. "Systematic combining: an abductive approach to case research." Journal of business research 55.7 (2002): 553-560.
- Dubois, Anna, and Lars-Erik Gadde. "The construction industry as a loosely coupled system: implications for productivity and innovation." Construction Management & Economics 20.7 (2002): 621-631.
