= Ivan Snehota =

Italian business theorist (1946–2022)

Ivan Snehota (1946–2022) was an Italian organizational theorist, consultant, and Professor of Marketing at the Faculty of Communication Sciences of the University of Lugano, known for his work in the field of business networks with Håkan Håkansson and others.

== Biography ==
Snehota obtained his PhD in Business Administration at the University of Uppsala in 1990 with the thesis, entitled "Notes on a Theory of Business Enterprise."

Snehota started his academic career as lecturer at the University of Uppsala from 1971 to 1979. After his graduation he returned to Italy, where he worked in industry in management positions and as management consultant until 1990. In that period he was also lecturer in marketing at the SDA Bocconi School of Management and at the University of Turin business school. In 1991 he returned to the University of Uppsala as associate professor, and in 1996 moved to the Stockholm School of Economics where he was coordinator of the Department of Marketing, Distribution and Industry Dynamics. In the new millennium he was appointed Professor of Marketing at the Faculty of Communication Sciences of the University of Lugano.

His research interests are in the field of "the development and theory of the firm, the business development, operation and dynamics of industrial markets and business-to-business - themes that developed in the research and in... of professional training programs in various corporate and European Business Schools."

== Selected publications ==
- Snehota, Ivan, IMP Group. International marketing and purchasing of industrial goods: An interaction approach. (1982).
- Snehota, Ivan (1990), Notes on a Theory of Business Enterprise, Doctoral Thesis, Uppsala University
- Snehota, Ivan, and Håkan Håkansson, eds. Developing relationships in business networks. Londres: Routledge, 1995.
- Ford, David, Lars-Erik Gadde, Håkan Håkansson, and Ivan Snehota. "Managing business relationships." (2003).
- Håkansson, H., Ford, D., Gadde, L. E., Snehota, I., & Waluszewski, A. (2009). Business in networks. John Wiley & Sons,.

Articles, a selection

- Håkansson, Håkan, and Ivan Snehota. "No business is an island: the network concept of business strategy." Scandinavian journal of management 5.3 (1989): 187–200.
- Gadde, Lars-Erik, and Ivan Snehota. "Making the most of supplier relationships." Industrial Marketing Management 29.4 (2000): 305–316.
