= Lars-Erik Gadde =

Swedish organizational theorist

Lars-Erik Gadde (born 1945) is a Swedish organizational theorist and Professor of Technology Management and Economics at Chalmers University of Technology in Gothenburg, Sweden. He is known for his work on business networks, professional purchasing. and case study research.

== Life and work ==
Gadde obtained his PhD at the University of Gothenburg in 1978 with the thesis, entitled "Efterfrågevariationer i vertikala marknadssystem" (Demand variations in vertical marketing systems).

After his graduation Gadde spend his academic career at the Institute for Management of Innovation and Technology, Gothenburg, which became Chalmers University of Technology in 1994. In the 1983 article "Research on Producer Goods Distribution in Sweden" gave his view on the state of the art of on his field of research, the industrial marketing:

Swedish interest in research on channels of distribution for industrial goods has been limited historically. The same is true in other countries as well, as has been reported, for example, by Ford. In fact, this is tree for the field of industrial marketing in general. It is a little surprising that industrial markets have been so neglected. If economic values are considered, producer markets are dominant over consumer markets. According to Flodhammar and Nielsen, the turnover of the Swedish producer market is four times that of the consumer market. One reason for the slight research interest is that up to the 1970s many industries could be characterised as operating in a 'seller's market.' Demand exceeded supply. No kind of modern marketing existed; it was only a question of selling.

His cooperation with Håkan Håkansson originates from when they did research in the Swedish automotive industry, particularly looking at "automotive component supply strategies." He also wrote a paper with Philippe A. Naert on marketing research in Europe. Soon after he joined the Industrial Marketing and Purchasing Group, and much of his research and publications has been under their wings. In the 1990s he also published some works on case study research in cooperation with Anna Dubois of the Chalmers University of Technology.

Gadde's research interest has remained in the field of "exchange processes among companies in business networks. These processes are analysed from two perspectives. The first concerns purchasing behaviour and purchasing strategies on the buying side, while the second deals with distribution strategies and distribution system dynamics on the selling side."

== Selected publications ==
- Gadde, Lars-Erik, and Håkan Håkansson. "Professional Purchasing." (1993).
- Håkansson, H., Ford, D., Gadde, L. E., Snehota, I., & Waluszewski, A. (2009). Business in Networks. John Wiley & Sons,.
- Gadde, Lars-Erik, Håkan Håkansson, and Göran Persson. Supply Network Strategies John Wiley & Sons, 2010.

Articles (a selection)

- Gadde, Lars-Erik, and Ivan Snehota. "Making the most of supplier relationships." Industrial Marketing Management 29.4 (2000): 305–316.
- Dubois, Anna, and Lars-Erik Gadde. "Systematic combining: an abductive approach to case research." Journal of Business Research 55.7 (2002): 553–560.
- Dubois, Anna, and Lars-Erik Gadde. "The construction industry as a loosely coupled system: implications for productivity and innovation." Construction Management and Economics 20.7 (2002): 621–631.
