= NBD =

NBD may refer to:

== Companies ==
- National Bank of Detroit, which went defunct in 1995
- National Bank of Dominica, a financial services firm in Roseau, Dominica
- National Business Daily, a Chinese financial and economic newspaper
- Emirates NBD, formerly National Bank of Dubai
- NBD Television, a UK-based international distributor of TV programming
- Nintendo Business Development, a Nintendo division focusing on smart devices

== Science and technology ==
- Negative binomial distribution, in mathematics
- Network block device, in computing
- Neurobiological brain disorder, of the nervous system
- Norbornadiene, a bicyclic hydrocarbon

== Other uses ==
- New business development, a business activity
