= Gadde =

Gadde is both a given name and surname. Notable people with the name include:

- Gadde Rajendra Prasad (born 1956), Indian film actor
- Gadde Ramamohan, Indian politician
- Lars-Erik Gadde (born 1945), Swedish business theorist
- Sindhura Gadde (born 1984), Indian beauty pageant
- Vijaya Gadde (born 1974), former Twitter policy head
