= M. Joseph Sirgy =

American marketing scholar known for research on quality of life

M. Joseph (Joe) Sirgy
- Citizenship: American
- Education: University of California, Los Angeles (UCLA; BA; 1974); California State University, Long Beach (CSULB; M.A.; 1977); University of Massachusetts Amherst (UMass; Ph.D.; 1979)
- Known for: Quality-of-life research; consumer behavior; macromarketing; business ethics
- Scientific career
- Fields: Marketing; quality-of-life studies; consumer behavior; macromarketing
- Workplaces: Virginia Polytechnic Institute and Virginia State University (Professor Emeritus of Marketing); North-West University, WorkWell Research Unit (Extraordinary Professor, 2020–2026)

M. Joseph Sirgy is an American marketing scholar known for research on quality of life, consumer well-being, and macromarketing. He is the Virginia Tech Real Estate Professor Emeritus of Marketing at Virginia Polytechnic Institute and Virginia State University. He co-founded the International Society for Quality-of-Life Studies (ISQOLS) and the journal Applied Research in Quality of Life, and served as president of the Academy of Marketing Science. His work has been cited more than 61,000 times on Google Scholar.

== Education ==
Sirgy earned a B.A. in psychology from the University of California, Los Angeles in 1974 and an M.A. in experimental psychology from California State University, Long Beach in 1977. He received a Ph.D. from the University of Massachusetts Amherst in 1979 with a dissertation titled Self-Concept in Consumer Behavior.

== Career ==
Sirgy joined the Department of Marketing at Virginia Tech in 1979. He was appointed the Virginia Tech Real Estate Professor of Marketing in 2015. He was granted emeritus status in 2020. He served as Extraordinary Professor at the WorkWell Research Unit at North-West University in South Africa (2020–2026).

In the early 2000s, he helped co-found the Macromarketing Society and the Community Indicators Consortium, and has served on the boards of both organizations. He also established the Management Institute for Quality-of-Life Studies (MIQOLS; https://www.miqols.org/) in 2001 and has served as its executive director (2001–present).

== Research ==
Sirgy's research has addressed quality-of-life measurement, consumer well-being, work well-being, community well-being, the self-concept in consumer behavior, and macromarketing. He has published 42 scholarly books and 203 peer-reviewed journal articles. His 1982 review article "Self-Concept in Consumer Behavior: A Critical Review," published in the Journal of Consumer Research, has been cited more than 7,000 times and is among his most cited works. The works listed below are selected from among his most frequently cited publications.

He is the author of The Psychology of Quality of Life: Hedonic Well-Being, Life Satisfaction, and Eudaimonia, published by Springer in 2021; the first edition appeared in 2002, with a revised edition in 2012.

== Awards and honors ==
- Distinguished Fellow Award, Academy of Marketing Science (1992).
- Distinguished Fellow Award, International Society for Quality-of-Life Studies (1998).
- Distinguished Quality-of-Life Researcher Award, ISQOLS (2003).
- Harold Berkman Service Award, Academy of Marketing Science (2007).
- Best Paper Award, Journal of Happiness Studies (2010), for "The Pleasant Life, the Engaged Life, and the Meaningful Life: What about the Balanced Life?"
- Charles R. Goeldner Article of Excellence Award, Journal of Travel Research (2011).
- EuroMed Management Research Award (2012), for outstanding achievements and groundbreaking contributions to well-being and quality-of-life research.
- Robert W. Nason Award, Macromarketing Society (2019), for extraordinary and sustained contributions to macromarketing.
- Founding Faculty Award, Program in Real Estate, Virginia Tech (2020).
- Best Paper Award, Applied Research in Quality of Life (2022), for “Shopping-Life Balance: Toward a Unifying Framework” (2020).
- Best Paper Award, Applied Research in Quality of Life (2025), for "The Dual Effects of Passion on Leisure Wellbeing" (2024).
- Best Paper Award, Applied Research in Quality of Life (2026), for "How Does Work-Life Conflict Influence Wellbeing Outcomes?".
- Clifford J. Shultz II Impact Award, Macromarketing Society (2026), for exemplary research and outreach that have notably advanced societal well-being.

== Selected publications ==
- Sirgy, M.J. (1982). "Self-Concept in Consumer Behavior: A Critical Review." Journal of Consumer Research, 9(3), 287–300.
- Sirgy, M.J. (2012). The Psychology of Quality of Life: Hedonic Well-Being, Life Satisfaction, and Eudaimonia (2nd ed.). Springer.
- Sirgy, M.J., Efraty, D., Siegel, P., & Lee, D.-J. (2001). "A New Measure of Quality of Work Life (QWL) Based on Need Satisfaction and Spillover Theories." Social Indicators Research, 55(3), 241–302.
- Sirgy, M.J., Lee, D.-J., & Bae, J. (2006). "Developing a Measure of Internet Well-Being: Nomological (Predictive) Validation." Social Indicators Research, 78(2), 205–249.
