= Public sector marketing =

Public sector marketing is about managing the relationships between government organizations, the public sector, and other parties that are seeking services from them.

These parties can include individuals, groups of individuals, organizations, or communities.

== Development of public sector marketing ==
Marketing within the public sector is the result of developments in both marketing and public management.

=== Concept of marketing ===
As a concept, marketing can be construed in two different ways.

- The managerial dimension, with focus on the tasks that an organization must fulfill in order to ensure long-term success with target groups.
- The functionality dimension, focusing on the notions of exchange and relationship as these occur between an organization and those individuals and groups who seek to satisfy their needs. In this sense, public sector marketing falls into the latter category of marketing.

Expanding the concept of marketing enables non-commercial aspects of exchanges to be taken into account, along with the reinforcement of the relational aspect of the exchange and the powerful development of marketing tools and techniques. These tools include systems for:

- obtaining and handling information,
- cost-analysis
- communication
- distribution

These tools and concepts can be applied to the public sector either partially or occasionally.

=== Development of public administration models ===
Over the last 20 years, the notion of public administration and its management models have changed considerably. While developing its economic activities and services for citizens, the state has promoted the use of tools (notably marketing tools) from the private sector. At the same time, the growing autonomy of many administrative units (through the creation of agencies) has given them the chance to take a different approach from that of the traditional public administration model.

Hybrid management models, developed by these agencies, reflect the public nature of their organization while developing exchanges of a more commercial nature, above all by customizing the relationship with service beneficiaries. Given the ideas of New Public Management—and the fact that service quality is no longer measured by the authority but by the beneficiary—administrative units have been encouraged to take account of the relational aspects of the exchange, and apply the corresponding tools for measuring service quality and the satisfaction of beneficiaries.

Because of politically defined requirements for public bodies to improve the quality of services and pay attention to citizens’ needs—as well as because governments have introduced competition to the provision of public services—these bodies face increasing uncertainty, which is exacerbated by their financing often partly depending on results. By using traditional marketing tools (e.g. better appreciating the needs and expectations of the beneficiaries of public action, detailing the content of the exchange (offer), improving communication about the offer, etc.) public bodies are able to reduce this uncertainty to some extent.

== Application of public sector marketing ==
For two main reasons it is not possible to determine whether marketing can really be applied to the public sector or not.

- The public section is not a homogenous entity, as it includes both services of a commercial nature (hospitals, tourism, etc.) and activities involving constraints (corrections, taxation, etc.). Thus, some elements of the public sector are very close to the private sector, with the application of marketing tools posing no real problem (for example, postal services).
- In some cases, the same public body may offer both freely available fixed price services, and at the same time oblige citizens to respect norms or stipulations. The police is a good example. The police may use force to inspect vehicles or stop drivers, arresting the latter if they break the law; yet who may also charge an event-organizer for their services in ensuring an event's safety.

Therefore, generalizing marketing throughout the public sector, without deeper analysis of the notions of exchange and relationship, is not easy.

In order to delimit situations in which marketing principles and approaches can be applied from those in which the basic conditions are not met, it is worth crossing types of exchange (absence of exchange, subject to constraint, or free) with the nature (subject to constraint, partially-free, or free) of the relationships that can emerge between the parties.

	Absence of exchange	Exchange subject to constraint // Free exchange
Relationship subject to constraint	no marketing	Selective use of marketing tools
Partially free relationship // Free relationship	Elements of relationship marketing	Potential application of the conceptual approach underlying marketing and of corresponding tools

=== Absence of exchange / relationship subject to constraint ===
The first case, which frequently occurs in the public sector, corresponds to the type of situation in which the relationship is subject to constraint and no exchange occurs.

A police officer who makes an arrest, a judge who issues a summons, etc., are all significant, concrete situations in which marketing, as a discipline, is absent from public sector thinking: one cannot speak of the satisfaction of a party or of freedom in the relationship. Furthermore, in order to protect people from the arbitrary use of constraint, these situations are clearly codified in democratic systems and the rules governing constraint (e.g., codes of procedure, administrative directives, etc.) are stringent.

This is not to imply that administrations and public officials are exempted from complying with a number of by now basic principles of modern society, such as showing respect for individuals (e.g., listening to people; showing a minimum of empathy; taking into account, as much as possible, certain characteristics of an individual who presents a handicap or does not understand the language, etc.), or employing communication skills (e.g., clearly explaining the situation and underlying expectations; justifying decisions in a way that is easily understandable; informing individuals of their rights, etc.). Even though some of these elements can also be discerned in the principles of relationship marketing, they do not provide a sufficient basis for discussing these public service activities in terms of a marketing approach.

=== Absence of exchange or partially free to free relationship ===
In situations in which exchange is absent and the relationship is devoid of constraint (i.e., is at least partially free), one may resort to an approach that more systematically takes elements of relationship marketing into account.

It is a fact that many public organization activities do not consist in the provisioning of services for citizens but instead in the development, implementation and monitoring of policies. Although all such activities do not culminate in an exchange, they can, however, involve individuals or groups of individuals, owing to the need to gather and analyze data, hold discussions with the representatives of these people, etc.

When, for example, a municipality decides to review its public transportation grid in response to expanding demand or out of a need to establish a competitive tendering process regarding any related concession, it can send citizens a questionnaire for the purpose of learning more about their transportation habits, hold a public briefing, or foster dialogue with citizens (e.g., Web forum, suggestion box, etc.). Depending on the activity and the institutional context, these organizations can apply the principles of relationship marketing with a view to establishing a lasting relationship of trust.

=== Possible exchange / relationship subject to constraint ===
A different kind of situation occurs where the relationship is subject to constraint but where a certain degree of exchange exists.

This is the case, for example, of mandatory periodic vehicle inspections that are, at the same time, the occasion of a concrete service transaction (i.e., authorization is given to use a vehicle in return for guarantees that the vehicle complies with safety standards). Owing to the absence of freedom in the relationship that is established between the administration and the service user, it is not possible to apply all marketing principles – regarding, for example, the segmentation of needs, expectations or behaviours, or the positioning of the service offering (due to little or no competitive environment, the absence of any possible differentiation in terms of service fee, etc.).

Nevertheless, organizations can apply a certain number of marketing tools by trying to adapt elements of the service offering in relation to recipients (for example, garage owners as opposed to individual citizens). One such way is to step up the use of communication tools to improve and simplify transactions between the organization and the recipient (e.g., the option of choosing the time of one's car inspection on the Internet; prepayment via various modern mechanisms, etc.). Another way is to establish ways of systematically improving the transaction and the relationship with service users (e.g., surveys on user satisfaction or service quality). This situation also applies in the case of compulsory education, tax collection, etc.

=== Possible exchange / partially free to free relationship ===
Whenever the relationship is at least partially free and a degree of exchange occurs, there is room for implementing more fully developed marketing approaches.

The simplest case involves the situation in which both the exchange and the relationship are totally free. Then, the public organization can, subject to existing laws and regulations, act like a private business to a very great extent. Such criteria are fully satisfied in the case of the continuing education programs offered by public universities, which enjoy considerable latitude in terms of accepting or refusing program participants and which are also free to determine the form and content of their program offering.

In the public sector, however, the freedom characterizing the relationship is often limited – where users are concerned – to accepting or refusing the corresponding service. That being said, limitations can apply to the choice of operator or supplier and both the offer and the terms and conditions of the exchange are subject to restrictions. As regards the organization, the ability and interest in using marketing tools stems directly from the possibility of incorporating differentiation criteria into the service offering and of obtaining input from users as part of this exchange.

== See also ==
- Marketing
- Business-to-government
