= Welkit =

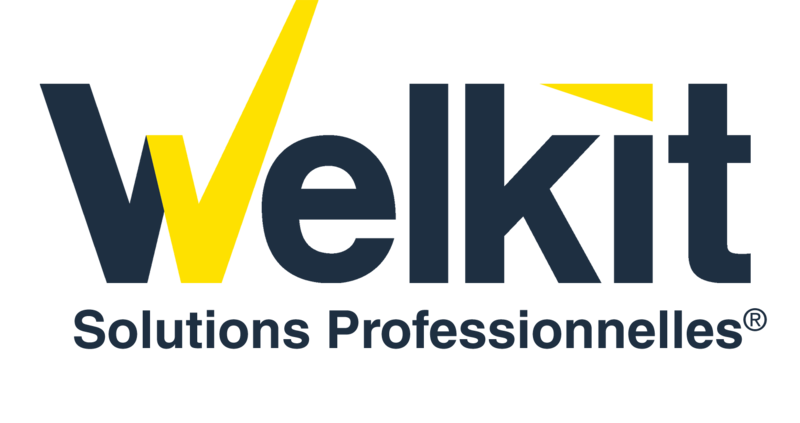
- Company type: Private company
- Industry: e-commerce, B2G
- Predecessor: USMC PRO (until 2015)
- Founded: 1989; 37 years ago Meudon, France
- Founders: Franck Douville
- Headquarters: Guer, France
- Area served: France
- Products: Military, Public Safety and Tactical Clothing and Gear
- Divisions: Welkit; Welkit Planet; Welkit Admin; Welkit Arms
- Website: www.welkit.fr

Welkit is a French e-commerce and B2G (business to government), also called B2A (business to administration), company. It specializes in the sale of professional equipment intended for the military and law enforcement members, who purchase a large part of their equipment themselves.

It supplies the French Ministry of Armed Forces and the French Ministry of the Interior by responding directly to or participating in national tenders, such as the renewal of semi-automatic pistols for the French forces attributed to the Glock company, as supplier of the new holster of the French Armed Forces included in the tender.

== History ==
=== 1989–1995: the beginnings as a military surplus ===
Welkit was founded on October 10, 1989, by Franck Douville in Meudon, near Paris, in the garage of his parents' house. Originally, Franck Douville called his company USMC and began by purchasing surplus military equipment from the "Domaines", which he then sold wholesale or retail through a paper catalog. Although the name USMC was the acronym for Uncle Sam's Military Catalog when the first catalog was released, it was mostly chosen in reference to the famous United States Marine Corps for their speed and excellent ability to fulfill their missions on all theaters of operation.

The USMC catalog became known among the French soldiers, and the company was able to develop and open the first store in the 11th arrondissement of Paris in 1992. But at this date, the company was a simple military surplus and still offered decommissioned equipment, which did not suit the vision of Franck Douville, who subsequently made a major decision for the future of the company.

=== 1996: specialization ===
In February 1996 after Jacques Chirac announced his intention to professionalize the army, that Franck Douville decides to radically change course, and to get closer to his initial vision for his company. Indeed, following the end of conscription and the resulting drop in the budget, several companies had to specialize. He decides to put an end to the sale of military surplus equipment, to supply only latest generation military and tactical gear. The new offer is attracting new types of customers: so-called "administrative" customers (The French Ministry of the Interior and Ministry of Armed Forces, special units and intervention groups, etc.). A new sub-organization was then created: the "Administration Pole" in order to respond and provide solutions to requests for contracts with adapted procedures and national calls for tenders.

=== 1998: launch of the e-commerce site ===
The Usmc-pro.com e-commerce site was created in 1998, but internet activity did not really take off until 2000. With the arrival of the Amazon in France, Franck Douville became aware of the importance of the internet and the change it is making in mail-order business, he decides to expand his commercial offer and build a team for the web only.

=== 2015: identity change ===
After much confusion between the United States Marine Corps and the company, the company decides to change its name and becomes Welkit.

=== 2018: privatization of the e-commerce site ===
With a view to strengthening its image as specialists, the Welkit company has decided to privatize its e-commerce website to offer products only to the military, the Law Enforcement members, whether engaged currently or previously.

== Warehouse ==
The company's head office is located in Montrouge in the Hauts de Seine department near Paris. Welkit's warehouse is located in Guer in the street of Camp Coëtquidan (ESM Saint-Cyr).

== Activities ==
=== E-commerce ===
The company offers individual equipment such as clothing, shoes, sleeping equipment, and other accessories, related to the defense and security fields, through a site closed to the general public where it is necessary to prove one's professional status to be able to order.

=== Administratives sales ===
The company mainly serves the French Ministry of the Armed Forces and the French Ministry of the Interior by responding in particular to national calls for tenders, for example it has won the contract for the new concealed port holster for the French Police and customs. It also serves other public agencies, local communities, and do export with NGOs such as WWF.

In 2019 Welkit participated in the national tender for the renewal of the French Army semi-automatic pistol awarded to the Austrian firm Glock by supplying the holster.
