= Baker Ahmad Alserhan =

Qatari writer

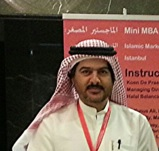
- Born: Baker Ahmad Alserhan
- Occupation: Author
- Known for: Chairman of the Global Islamic Marketing Conference (GIMAC)
- Notable work: The Principles of Islamic marketing

Baker Ahmad Alserhan is a researcher, public speaker, writer, and consultant. He is full professor in management and marketing at Princess Sumaya University for Technology and is the author of The Principles of Islamic marketing. He is the president of the International Islamic Marketing Association (IIMA) and the Chairman of the Global Islamic Marketing Conference (GIMAC).

Alserhan founded four academic journals, two of them with Emerald and ‘Inderscience’. His research interests include Islamic marketing and branding, Islamic hospitality, Islamic lifestyles, and Islamic business studies.
