= HT Tran =

Hien Manh Tran
- Born: San Jose, California
- Education: San Jose State University
- Occupation: Construction contractor
- Years active: 2010–present
- Employer: Anvil Builders Inc.
- Known for: Recruiting, hiring and supporting war veterans, including providing on-the-job PTSD support
- Awards: ENR Award of Excellence
- Military career
- Allegiance: United States of America
- Branch: Army
- Rank: Sergeant
- Unit: 10th Mountain Division
- Awards: Purple Heart
- Website: anvilbuilders.com/team/hien-manh-tran/

HT Tran (born Hien Manh Tran), is an American construction contractor, and war veteran who has received awards for his support for other veterans by hiring them in the construction industry. He is CEO of Anvil Builders. In 2015, he received the Award of Excellence from Engineering News-Record (formerly the Man of the Year award).

== Family ==
Tran was born in California to South Vietnamese nationals who immigrated to the US in the late 1970s. He married in 2011 and has one son. Tran graduated from San Jose State University with a business marketing degree.

Tran's family has a history of service in the military. His great uncle, Tran Van Chon, was chief of naval operations and counterpart to Admiral Elmo Zumwalt. His father had also served in the military there. His brother, Hoa Tran, enlisted in the Marine Corps after the September 11 attacks. The family history of military service, along with the desire to serve inspired by a conversation with friends about effecting change, led Tran to enlist in the military.

== Military service ==
Tran was working for Macy's after graduating from college when he made the decision to enlist in the military in 2006. He joined the Army, was assigned to Anvil Company of the 10th Mountain Division and was deployed to the Iraq War, serving near Kirkuk. Tran was serving under Captain Clayton Hinchman who recognized his leadership qualities and made him the radio transmission officer. Hinchman and Tran were severely injured by an improvised explosive device (IED) while on patrol on May 10, 2008. Hinchman, who had stepped on the IED, had his leg blown off. Tran lost an eye and injured his leg and brain. Both were sent to Walter Reed Army Medical Center for recovery. Trans injuries left him missing a right eye, a titanium rod in his left leg and multiple scars across his body.

During a 15-month recovery at Walter Reed, Hinchman and Tran met Bob Nilsson, who helped reinvent their post-service careers. Nilsson, a retired executive of Turner Construction, was supporting wounded veterans by visiting them in military hospitals and supporting them in getting careers in construction or real estate. Nilsson's efforts led to the creation of a non-profit called 100 Entrepreneurs Foundation Inc., that helps train veterans to start businesses. Both Hinchman and Tran attended classes with this program. Hinchman started a computer-network consulting company and Tran would go on to start a construction company.

== Anvil Builders ==
After leaving the Army, Tran first worked at Northrop Grumman as a procurement officer. This work, with the training from 100 Entrepreneurs, led Tran to start a construction company. In 2010, Tran founded, and is the CEO of, Anvil Builders, a full-service general contractor. The name Anvil Builders came from the name of his infantry company.

His partners include Richard Leider and Alan Guy. Tran also credits his experience in Iraq turning abandoned or won-over outposts into habitable and defensible spaces as part of his training to lead a construction company.

Anvil Builders has completed worked for the Salesforce Transit Center, Pacific Gas and Electric Company, the San Francisco Public Utilities Commission, San Francisco parks, the Moscone Center, and San Francisco International Airport. Tran has been interviewed for the veteran support he received and also expressed a goal of hiring and supporting more veterans in his company.

== Awards ==
For his injuries in military service, Tran was awarded the Purple Heart.

Tran received the ENR Award of Excellence "for his tenacity and courage to recover from devastating injury and to envision—even with just one good eye—a future as a construction-industry CEO who can build San Francisco and careers for his employees and their families; for embracing the obligation and value in hiring veterans in his own company and inspiring peers to do likewise; and for embodying the qualities of what industry needs in its next-generation leaders." The award was received at a black-tie gala held at the New York Marriott Marquis on April 16, 2015.
