= GovBizConnect =

GovBizConnect, Inc.
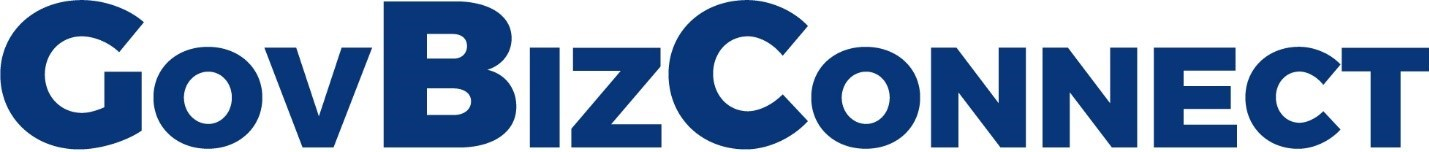
- Type: Private
- Industry: Software
- Founded: 2015
- Founder: Tom Skypek
- Key people: Bill Thoet, VP for Business Development Adam Velie, VP for Product Management
- Website: https://govbizconnect.com

GovBizConnect, Inc. was a U.S.-based Software-as-a-Service (SaaS) company founded in 2015 to connect small and large business in the government contracting industry. It offered business-to-business and business-to-government solutions.

== Background ==
GovBizConnect, Inc. is domiciled in Dover, Delaware and maintains a presence in Washington, D.C., Connecticut, and Colorado. In 2016, it was named a Top 100 GovTech brand by marketing analytics firm Onalytica. The company is part of the emerging GovTech movement that has been chronicled by data analytics firm CB Insights. The GovTech movement is closely related to the civic technology movement. Tom Skypek founded the company after seeing the inefficiencies in the system for finding business partners in the government contracting market.

== See also ==
- Government Accountability Office
