= Meta marketing =

Meta marketing is "the synthesis of all managerial, traditional, scientific, social and historical foundations of marketing,” a term first coined by E.J.Kelly while discussing the issue of ethics and science of marketing Thus, Meta Marketing is an attempt to widen the horizons of marketing by covering non-profit organisations. The best examples of Meta Marketing can be selling family planning ideas or the idea of prohibition.

A Meta market will bring all buyers and sellers in one place for one purpose only. Instead of giving multiple products to one customer, a Meta market brings together different customers who need not necessarily differentiate between closely related products. Meta market is thus, a place, where everything connected with a certain market can be found. Let's say a car selling in a Meta market would be a website, that sells cars but you will also find car parts there, add-ons for cars, colours for cars, mechanic's reviews, etc. So Meta market of a certain market is a market, where you can find everything about that market and everything about markets that are strongly connected to that market.

Meta marketing is an approach to the study of marketing and its relationship to every aspect of life by focussing on all social, ethical, scientific and business experience in marketing, thus establishing a body of knowledge base on the integration of every facet of experience with the human personality.

There can be two different ideologies associated with meta-marketing. One, as described above, is essentially bringing together closely related industries under one umbrella industry and the other is as follows:

Even today, marketing is seen by many a CEO as a post-manufacturing activity, simply because all the elements (packaging, branding, distribution, selling, advertising, sales promotion), take place usually after the basic product is made. A hangover has remained of a product centred, rather than the consumer-centred frame of mind.

Until the Seventies, industrialists spent considerably more effort and money in deciding the investment in plant and machinery rather than the intricacies of marketing. Often, investment decisions were made pre-manufacturing of the product and hence, they failed to realise that the full potential of a product being sold can be maximised for customers not just by merely design and application, but also by integrating closely related products into one industry as a whole.

Also, the growth phase of many industries acted as a contributing factor as each product, no matter of what category was selling like hot-cakes. However, today, the situation has changed vastly. It's all about mapping the customer's brain and competitor's strategies.

Today, understanding and considering the environment in which the industry operates has also become increasingly important. Business policy makers have, of late, made it very evident that there is a need for a strategic intent and a single-minded focus on the industry.

Also, both corporate and marketing strategy thinkers, as well as consultants, are rediscovering the need to "reshape the industry." It can be related to what Joseph Schumpeter of the Austrian School of economics discovered a long time ago namely, that the central component and the driving force behind industry evolution was Innovation.

A meta-marketing thinker never replicates the marketing mix of the market leader or predecessor. Going as far away as possible from the "success secret" may be a less dangerous route to take. This version of Meta Marketing says that it is better to do something different, rather than follow what the industry is doing.

As S. Ramachander highlights, “such insight inevitably precedes creating a new competitive paradigm, including rewriting the rulebook itself and changing the rules of the game. In an increasingly competitive and transnational arena, marketing companies will have to ponder more and more about not just an offering that is different or better, but one that is an expression of a marketing insight.”
