= Buying center =

Organizational behavior

A buying center, also called a decision-making unit (DMU), brings together "all those members of an organization who become involved in the buying process for a particular product or service".

The concept of a decision-making unit (DMU) for purchasing purposes was developed in 1967 by Robinson, Farris and Wind (1967). A DMU consists of all the people of an organization who are involved in the buying decision. The decision to purchase involves those with purchasing and financial expertise and those with technical expertise, and (in some cases) an organization's top management. McDonald, Rogers and Woodburn (2000) state that identifying and influencing all the people involved in the buying decision is a prerequisite in the process of selling to an organization.

== Modelling buying centers ==
The concept of a buying center (as a focus of business-to-business marketing, and as a core factor in creating customer value and influence in organisational efficiency and effectiveness) formulates the understanding of purchasing decision-making in complex environments.

Some of the key factors influencing a buying center or DMU's activities include:

- Buy class or situation. The "Buygrid" model developed by Robinson et al. in 1967 classified "buy classes" as "straight rebuy", "modified rebuy" or "new task", also referred to as "new task buying". Michelle Bunn extended this range to six basic buying situations in a 1993 article:
  - Casual purchasing involving no search or analysis
  - Routine low priority purchasing or rebuying
  - Simple modified rebuys where selection options are limited
  - Judgemental new purchasing tasks, e.g. for a special type of equipment
  - Complex modified rebuys requiring more structured processes for establishing and evaluating options, such as through a competitive tendering process
  - Strategic new tasks establishing long-term business partnerships and purchasing plans.
- Product type (e.g. materials, components, plant and equipment, or maintenance, repair and operations (MRO)
- Importance of the purchase.

In some cases the buying center is an informal ad hoc group drawn together for a limited period of time, but in other cases it is a formally sanctioned group with a specific mandate. American research undertaken by McWilliams in 1992 found out that the mean size of a buying center mainly consisted of four people. The range in this research was between three and five people. The type of purchase that has to be done and the stage of the buying process influence the size. More recent research found that the structure, including the size, of buying centers depends on the organizational structure, with centralization and formalization driving the development of large buying centers.

== Decision-making process ==
When the DMU wants to purchase a certain product or service, a number of sequential or iterative steps are taken inside the buying center:

- Need or problem recognition: the recognition can start for two reasons. The first reason can be to solve a specific problem of the company. The other reason can be to improve a company's current operations/performance or to pursue new market opportunities.
- Determining product specification: the specification includes the characteristics and functionality which the product/service that is going to be purchased must contain.
- Supplier and product search: this process contains the search for suppliers that can meet a company's product or service needs. First a supplier that matches with the specifications of the company has to be found. The second condition is that the supplier can satisfy the organization's financial and supply requirements.
- Evaluation of proposals and selection of suppliers: the different possible suppliers will be evaluated by the different departments of the company.
- Selection of order routine: this stadium starts after the selection of the supplier. It mainly consists of negotiating and agreeing with the supplier about certain details.
- Performance feedback and evaluation: performance and quality of the purchased goods will be evaluated.

Spekman and Gronhaug in 1986 considered whether decision-making was best characterised as "sequential" or "iterative" and found that "iterative" is a preferable term, reflecting patterns of buyer decision-making which allow for issues at different stages to be revisited.

In this process of making decisions different roles can be given to certain members of the center or the unit depending on the importance of the part of the organization.

Robinson et al.'s "Buygrid Framework" saw new task activities, dealing with a problem which has not arisen before, as more complex than the other buy classes, and closer to achieving a general solution applicable in future rebuy activities. McQuiston in 1989 noted mixed empirical findings regarding the framework: "some studies have shown that participation and influence do vary according to the buygrid framework ... but other studies have shown that they do not". Co-author Yoram Wind, looking back at the Buygrid model 25 years after its publication, held that the model had provided "a very useful framework" whose "underlying dimensions [were] valid", but "its generalizability under a variety of market situations [was] not yet completely understood".

== Issues in buying center research ==
There are several conceptual and methodological issues concerning buying centers which in 1986 were thought to need additional research. These issues can be divided into:

Buying center boundaries and buying center domain

Distinguishing internal buying center processes from the influence of external environmental factors, also defining and delimiting the activities of a particular buying center. Webster and Wind (1972) list a number of environmental factors including physical, economic, legal and cultural aspects of the external environment, and identify physical, technological, economic and cultural aspects with "the [internal] organisational climate". Johnston and Bonoma used interaction theory in a 1981 paper to help analyse the distinction between internal and external factors.

Buying center structure

Understanding how organizational structures may differ from or may shape the structure of the buying center, and examining how a particular buying strategy may serve to mediate the effects of environmental uncertainty on the structure of the buying center.

Process considerations in buying center

Power and conflict issues within the buying center.

Decision making

One stream of research focuses on the number of decision phases and their timing and the other emphasizes the type of decision-making model (or choice routine) utilized. Brinkmann and Voeth refer to two stages: individuals first form their own preferences, and then a group decision is made on the basis of the individuals' views. On timing, Doyle et al observed that industrial straight rebuys in the 1970's could take anything from a week to seven months, while new task and modified rebuys might take from 7 months to 5 years.

Communications flow

The informal interactions that emerge during the buying process.

Application to small and medium-sized businesses

Andrews and Rogers noted in 2005 that very little academic discussion had taken place regarding buyer behaviour within small and medium-sized enterprises (SMEs). Thompson and Panayiotopoulos suggest that some purchasing decisions in SMEs, especially in a rebuy context, are made by one person and therefore not really a "group" activity, although in a new-buy situation, "the influence of other people may be greater".

Information sources

Brinkmann and Voeth found it useful to draw on interviews with sales staff instead of interviews with buying staff: their approach avoided data collection difficulties which arise in asking individual group members to account for group decisions which may have been influenced by dominant individuals.

== See also ==
- Procurement - formalised organizational procedures for purchasing
