= Sacralization =

Sacralization or sacralisation may refer to:

- Sanctification, the act or process of acquiring sanctity in a religious context
- Sacralization, a social or political phenomenon; see political religion
- Sacralization of the fifth lumbar vertebra, a congenital vertebral anomaly

== See also ==
- Sacralism, the confluence of church and state wherein one is called upon to change the other
- Sacral (disambiguation)
