= Business marketing =

Marketing practice

Business marketing is a marketing practice of individuals or organizations (including commercial businesses, governments, and institutions). It allows them to sell products or services to other companies or organizations, who either resell them, use them in their products or services, or use them to support their work.

The field of marketing can be broken down into many sections such as business-to-business (B2B) marketing, business-to-consumer (B2C) marketing, business-to-government marketing (B2G), and business-to-developer (B2D) marketing. However, business marketing is typically associated with the business-to-business sector.

== Origins ==
The practice of a purveyor of goods trading with another may be as old as commerce itself. In relation to marketing today, its history is more recent. Michael Morris, Leyland Pitt, and Earl Dwight Honeycutt say that for several years business marketing took "a back seat" to consumer marketing. This entailed providers of goods or services selling directly to households through mass media and retail channels. David Lichtenthal (professor of marketing at Zicklin School of Business) notes in his research that business marketing has existed since the mid-19th century. He adds that the bulk of research on business marketing has come in the last 25 years.

This began to change in the middle to late 1970s. Academic periodicals, including the Journal of Business-to-Business Marketing and the Journal of Business & Industrial Marketing, now publish studies on the subject regularly. A 2005 paper from the University of Portsmouth refers to Fill and Fill's Business-to-business marketing: relationships, systems and communication (2005) as a key academic text on this subject, and works on the Buy Class (see Buying center) by Robinson, Farris and Wind (1967) and the decision-making unit by Webster and Wind (1972) as the "traditional references".

Professional conferences on business marketing are held every year and courses are commonplace at many universities today. According to Jeremy Kourdi, more than half of marketing majors start their careers in business marketing rather than consumer marketing.

=== Internal and external efficiency ===
The internal efficiency of a business entity is the factor by which it prepares a product or service in a cost efficient manner. The external efficiency of a business entity is the factor by which it effectively markets itself so as to utilize the market, in order to retrieve maximum profits from that internal efficiency. So in a B2B market setting, the external efficiencies of the business entities due to conduct trade is vital to the success of the B2B transaction, especially if they belong to the same concern, in which case an internal market between the co-owned business entities is emergent. Being able to make use of external economies of scale within the same ownership group is actually one of the motivations for creating a concern.

== Business and consumer markets (B2C) ==
Business markets have derived demand, meaning that demand for business products exists because of demand in the consumer market. An example would be a government wishing to purchase equipment for a nuclear power plant. Another example would be when items are in popular demand. The underlying consumer demand that has triggered this is that people are consuming more electricity (by using more household devices such as washing machines and computers). Business markets do not exist in isolation.

A single consumer market demand can give rise to hundreds of business market demands. The demand for cars creates demands for castings, forgings, plastic components, steel, and tires. In turn, this creates demands for casting sand, forging machines, mining materials, polymers, and rubber. Each of these growing demands has triggered more demands.

As the spending power of citizens increases, countries generally see an upward wave in their economies. Cities or countries with growing consumption are generally growing business markets.

== Comparison with consumer marketing ==
Despite the differences between business and consumer marketing from a surface perspective being seemingly obvious, there are more subtle distinctions between the two with substantial ramifications. Dwyer and Tanner note that business marketing generally entails shorter and more direct channels of distribution.

While consumer marketing is aimed at large groups through mass media and retailers, the negotiation process between the buyer and seller is more personal in business marketing. According to Hutt and Speh (2004), most business marketers commit only a small part of their promotional budgets to advertising, and that is usually through direct mail efforts and trade journals. While advertising is limited, it often helps the business marketer set up successful sales calls.

Both business to business (B2B) and business-to-consumer (B2C) marketing is done with the ultimate intention of making a profit to the seller (business-to-business marketing). In B2C, B2B and B2G marketing situations, the marketer must always:

- successfully match the product or service strengths with the needs of a definable target market;
- position and price to align the product or service with its market, often an intricate balance; and
- communicate and sell it in the fashion that demonstrates its value effectively to the target market.

These are the fundamental principles of the 4 Ps of marketing (the marketing mix) first documented by E. Jerome McCarthy in 1960.

While "other businesses" might seem like the simple answer, Dwyer and Tanner say business customers fall into four broad categories: companies that consume products or services, government agencies, institutions and resellers.

The first category includes original equipment manufacturers, such as large auto-makers who buy gauges to put in their cars and also small firms owned by 1–2 individuals who purchase products to run their business. The second category, government agencies, is the biggest. In fact, the U.S. government is the biggest single purchaser of products and services in the country, spending more than $300 billion annually. But this category also includes state and local governments. The third category, institutions, includes schools, hospitals and nursing homes, churches and charities. Finally, resellers consist of wholesalers, brokers and industrial distributors.

== Strategies ==
=== Target market ===
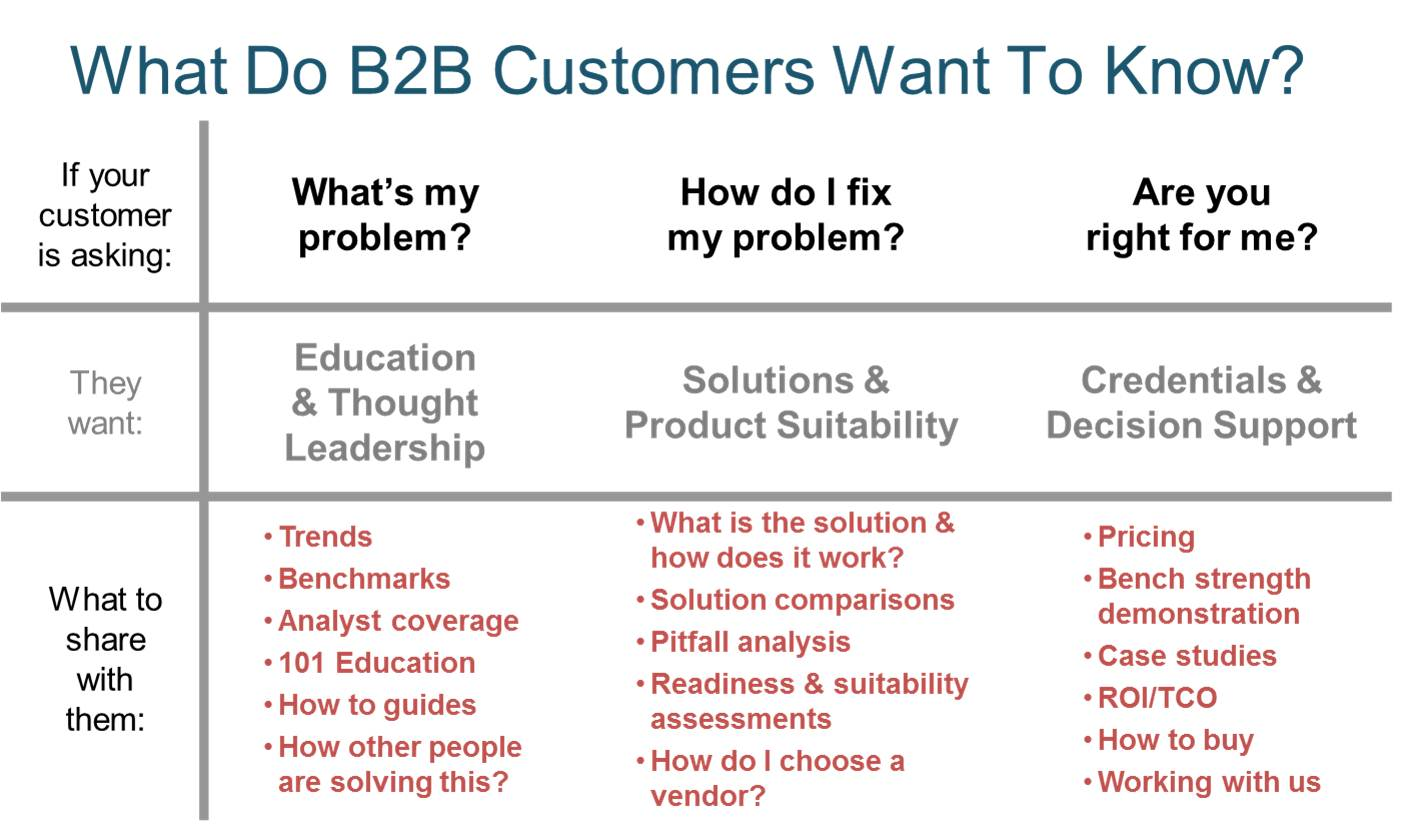
B2B Buyer Decision Map: Problem, solution alternatives, decision support

Often the target market for a business product or service is smaller and has more specialized needs reflective of a specific industry or niche. A B2B niche, a segment of the market, can be described in terms of firmographics which requires marketers to have good business intelligence in order to increase response rates. There may be multiple influencers on the purchase decision, which may also have to be marketed to, though they may not be members of the decision making unit. In addition the research and decision making process a B2B buyer undertakes will be more extensive. Finally the purchase information that buyers are researching changes as they go through the buying process.

=== Pricing ===
Business-to-business sales typically command premium pricing compared to the consumer market and may involve different payment terms. This pricing premium is determined by a brand's reputation.

== Scale ==
Hutt and Speh (2001) note that "business marketers serve the largest market of all; the dollar volume of transactions in the industrial or business market significantly exceeds that of the ultimate consumer market". For example, they note that companies such as GE, DuPont and IBM spend more than $60 million a day on purchases to support their operations.

Dwyer and Tanner (2006) say the purchases made by companies, government agencies and institutions "account for more than half of the economic activity in industrialized countries such as the United States, Canada and France".

A 2003 study sponsored by the Business Marketing Association estimated that business-to-business marketers in the United States spend about $85 billion a year to promote their goods and services. The BMA study breaks that spending out as follows (figures are in billions of dollars):

- Trade Shows/Events -- $17.3
- Internet/Electronic Media -- $12.5
- Promotion/Market Support -- $10.9
- Magazine Advertising -- $10.8
- Publicity/Public Relations -- $10.5
- Direct Mail -- $9.4
- Dealer/Distributor Materials -- $5.2
- Market Research -- $3.8
- Telemarketing -- $2.4
- Directories -- $1.4
- Other -- $5.1

Despite the stream of leads and undeniable impact of marketing in B2B organizations, a 2021 report by Statista states that majority of businesses only allocate 5% of their budget towards promotions. By contrast, B2C companies typically spend 5% to 12% of their total revenue on marketing.

According to Morris, Pitt and Honeycutt (2001), the growth of business marketing is largely due to three "revolutions".

1. Technological revolution. Technology is changing at an unprecedented pace, and these changes are speeding up the pace of new product and service development. A large part of that has to do with the Internet, which is discussed in more detail below. Technology and business strategy go hand in hand. Both are correlated. While technology supports forming organization strategy, the business strategy is also helpful in technology development. Both play a role in business marketing.
2. Entrepreneurial revolution. To stay competitive, many companies have downsized and reinvented themselves. Adaptability, flexibility, speed, aggressiveness and innovativeness are the keys to remaining competitive today. Marketing is taking the entrepreneurial lead by finding market segments, untapped needs and new uses for existing products, and by creating new processes for sales, distribution and customer service.
3. (Occurring within marketing itself) Companies are looking beyond traditional assumptions and they are adopting new frameworks, theories, models and concepts. They are also moving away from the mass market and the preoccupation with the transaction. Relationships, partnerships and alliances are what define marketing today. The cookie-cutter approach is out. Companies are customizing marketing programs to individual accounts.

== See also ==
- Business-to-business marketing
- Business-to-consumer marketing
- Business-to-government marketing
- Industrial marketing
- Marketing

== Footnotes ==
- Anderson, James C., and Narus, James A. (2004) Business Market Management: Understanding, Creating, and Delivering Value, 2nd Edition, 2004, Pearson Education, Inc. ISBN 978-0131408418
- Business Marketing Association (2003) "Marketing Reality Survey"
- Blaney, Bill (2012) B2B A To Z. Marketing Tools and Strategies That Generate Leads For Business-To-Business Companies, Denham Publishing, 2012. p. 8–12 ISBN 978-0988497702
- Dwyer, F. Robert, Tanner, John F. (2006). Business Marketing: Connecting Strategy, Relationships, and Learning (3rd ed.). McGraw-Hill/Irwin. ISBN 978-0073529905.
- Greco, John A. Jr. (June 13, 2005). "Past indicates promising future for b-to-b direct". BtoB Magazine.
- Hutt, Michael D., Speh, Thomas W. (2004). Business Marketing Management: A Strategic View of Industrial and Organizational Markets (8th ed.). Thomson/South-Western. ISBN 978-0324190434.
- Reid, David A.; Plank, Richard E. (2004). Fundamentals of Business Marketing Research. Best Business Books, an Imprint of The Haworth Press, Inc. ISBN 978-0789023117.
- Brown, Duncan and Hayes, Nick. Influencer Marketing: Who really influences your customers?, Butterworth-Heinemann, 2008
- John Fahy and David Jobber, Foundations of marketing, Rogan (2011: p137)
