= Sacral =

Sacral may refer to:

- Sacred, associated with divinity and considered worthy of spiritual respect or devotion
- Of the sacrum, a large, triangular bone at the base of the spine
