= David Ford (marketing scientist) =

British organizational theorist

David Ford (born 1944) is a British organizational theorist, Professor Emeritus at the University of Bath School of Management, and co-founder of the International Marketing and Purchasing Group (IMP Group) in the mid 1970s. He is known for his work with Håkan Håkansson on business networks.

== Biography ==
Ford obtained his BSc in Mechanical Engineering at the University of Salford, his MSc at the University of Bradford, and his PhD at the Manchester Business School. In 2007 he was awarded an Honorary Degree from the Uppsala Universitet, Sweden for developing "a worldwide system for improving the way companies interact with customers and suppliers."

Ford started his academic career at the University of Bath as lecturer, and promoted to senior lecturer, reader and in 1989 Professor of Marketing. In 2008 he retired as Emeritus Professor, and became Affiliate Professor at KEDGE Business School in Marseille, France. In 1976 he was co-founder of the Industrial Marketing and Purchasing Group (IMP group).

Ford's research interests are in the field of "relationships between companies develop and how they can be managed effectively. It also involves issues of technological development within and between companies. I am currently working as part of the team on the "Newmark" project. This study is looking at ways in which complex networks of companies operate and how companies behave within them."

== Selected publications ==
- IMP Group & David Ford (ed). Understanding business markets: Interaction, relationships and networks. London: Academic Press, 1990.
- Ford, David, Lars-Erik Gadde, and Håkan Håkansson. Managing business relationships. (2003).

Articles, a selection:

- Ford, David. "The development of buyer-seller relationships in industrial markets." European journal of marketing 14.5/6 (1980): 339–353.
- Turnbull, Peter, David Ford, and Malcolm Cunningham. "Interaction, relationships and networks in business markets: an evolving perspective." Journal of Business & Industrial Marketing 11.3/4 (1996): 44–62.
- Håkansson, Håkan, and David Ford. "How should companies interact in business networks?." Journal of business research 55.2 (2002): 133–139.
