= Jerry Wind =

Israeli-American marketing scholar and professor

Yoram (Jerry) Wind
- Occupation: Marketing scholar
- Title: Lauder Professor Emeritus and Professor of Marketing
- Awards: Buck Weaver Award; Parlin Award; Converse Award; AMA/Irwin Distinguished Educator Award; Reimagine Education Lifetime Impact Award

Academic background
- Education: Hebrew University of Jerusalem (BA, MA); Stanford University (PhD)

Academic work
- Discipline: Marketing, behavioral science
- Institutions: Wharton School of the University of Pennsylvania
- Notable works: Market Segmentation; Product Policy; Conjoint Analysis; Beyond Advertising (2016); Creativity in the Age of AI (2025)

Yoram (Jerry) Wind is an Israeli-American marketing scholar. He is the Lauder Professor Emeritus and Professor of Marketing at the Wharton School of the University of Pennsylvania, where he has been a faculty member since 1967. In addition to his academic work, he provides marketing-driven business consulting and expert testimony in intellectual property litigation.

== Education ==
Wind earned his Bachelor of Arts in Economics and Political Science and his Master of Arts in Business Administration and Political Science from the Hebrew University of Jerusalem. He subsequently received a PhD in marketing and the behavioral sciences from Stanford University in 1966.

== Career ==
Wind's career at Wharton is marked by the founding and leadership of several academic programs. He was the founding director of the SEI Center for Advanced Studies in Management, a position he held for three decades. He also led the development of the Wharton Executive MBA, the Lauder Institute, and the 1990 MBA curriculum. Wind also established the Wharton Fellows program, which he directed for over 20 years.

In the publishing and global education sectors, he initiated Wharton School Publishing and served as its founding editor. He is a co-founder of the Reimagine Education Global Competition and annual conference. Additionally, he was a co-founder of Reichman University in Israel, formerly known as the Interdisciplinary Center (IDC) Herzliya, and serves on its academic council.

== Research and consulting ==
Wind has contributed more than 300 articles and chapters to marketing literature. His research focuses on global marketing strategy, corporate transformation, and the intersection of technology and creativity. In 2025, he published Creativity in the Age of AI, exploring toolkits for modern cognitive adaptation. He also developed specialized educational content for platforms such as Coursera regarding the application of creativity in business environments.

Beyond academia, Wind advises corporate leadership on marketing-driven business strategy. He has served as an expert witness in numerous intellectual property cases and frequently lectures on the evolution of digital business models.

== Boards and civic involvement ==
Wind serves as a trustee for several cultural and educational institutions, including the Philadelphia Museum of Art and the Curtis Institute of Music. He is a member of the art committee for Grounds For Sculpture and serves on the marketing committee for the Woodmere Art Museum.

== Awards and recognition ==
Wind is the recipient of major awards in the field of marketing, as well as institutional honors for educational innovation:

- **Charles Coolidge Parlin Marketing Research Award** (1985)
- **AMA-Irwin-McGraw-Hill Distinguished Marketing Educator Award** (1993)
- **Paul D. Converse Award** (1996)
- **Buck Weaver Award** (2007)
- **Reimagine Education Lifetime Impact Award** (2024)
- **Inductee, Marketing Hall of Fame** (2017)

In 2014, his work was compiled in the eight-volume anthology Legends in Marketing: Yoram (Jerry) Wind.

== Selected bibliography ==
- Market Segmentation (1982). ISBN 978-0201083620
- The Network Imperative: How to Survive and Grow in the Age of Digital Business Models (2016). ISBN 978-0134448572
- Beyond Advertising: Creating Value Through All Customer Touchpoints (2016). ISBN 978-1119043799
- Creativity in the Age of AI: Toolkits for the Modern Mind (2025).
