= Account-based marketing =

B2B marketing strategy focused on key accounts

Account-based marketing (ABM), also known as key account marketing, is a business-to-business (B2B) marketing strategy in which companies focus resources on a defined set of high-value accounts, treating each as a distinct market rather than pursuing broad-based outreach.

The term was coined in 2003 by Bev Burgess at the Information Technology Services Marketing Association (ITSMA).

This formalized earlier practices of key account management and industrial marketing, positioning ABM as a structured framework for aligning sales and marketing around specific accounts.

Today, ABM is widely adopted by large B2B organizations. Most practitioners consider it to deliver higher ROI than traditional demand generation approaches. Account-based marketing is typically employed in enterprise-level sales organizations.

== History ==
Account-based marketing developed in the early 2000s as companies searched for more structured ways to coordinate sales and marketing for their most important customers. In complex business-to-business contexts, ABM is a way to expand business within existing accounts, where broader industry-level marketing would not be sufficiently targeted. In scenarios involving long sales cycles, ABM can increase customer lifetime value, and it may also be applied to key prospect accounts in support of new opportunities.

Earlier approaches, such as key account management and industrial marketing, had emphasized building close relationships with strategic clients, but these were not yet formalized as a distinct marketing strategy.

The term "account-based marketing" was coined in 2003 by Bev Burgess at the Information Technology Services Marketing Association (ITSMA), where she was managing director of the European division and led the organization’s ABM practice.

At ITSMA, Burgess and colleagues codified ABM as a framework for treating key accounts as individual markets and for integrating tailored marketing with coordinated sales engagement.

During the 2010s, adoption of ABM accelerated as digital tools made it easier to identify, personalize, and engage accounts at scale. Analyst firms such as Forrester and Gartner began publishing evaluations of ABM platforms, contributing to its recognition as a distinct software and services category. By the early 2020s, industry surveys reported that most large B2B organizations had implemented ABM programs, and many found that these programs delivered higher return on investment compared with traditional demand generation methods.

== Types ==
According to Burgess, there are three main types of account-based marketing:

- Strategic ABM (one-to-one): Customized programs for individual accounts, built with deep sales collaboration.
- ABM Lite (one-to-few): Tailored initiatives for small clusters of accounts with similar issues.
- Programmatic ABM (one-to-many): Scalable campaigns using technology and data to personalize marketing for dozens or hundreds of accounts.

In her 2025 book Account-Based Marketing: The Definitive Handbook for B2B Marketers, Burgess expanded this framework to five types, reflecting how organizations apply different approaches across tiers of accounts:

- Strategic ABM: The original form, highly bespoke programs for a company’s most important accounts, often managed at a “CMO-of-the-account” level.
- Scenario ABM: A lighter version of Strategic ABM, focused on a specific set of interventions over a limited period to achieve targeted outcomes.
- Segment ABM: Campaigns designed for small clusters of accounts with common drivers or industry context, allowing partial customization at scale.
- Programmatic ABM: Automated, “always-on” personalization aligned to industries or roles, often triggered by intent data and digital signals.
- Pursuit Marketing: ABM applied in competitive deal situations or major opportunities, where marketing and sales collaborate on highly focused campaigns to win specific bids.

Burgess describes these approaches as a portfolio model, in which organizations often use more than one type simultaneously, depending on account value, buying context, and available resources.

== Roles of sales and marketing teams ==
Account-based marketing requires close alignment of sales and marketing teams: organizations integrate marketing activities with sales objectives and use feedback from sales teams to refine targeting and identify new opportunities. The success of ABM depends on a close working relationship between the two functions, with marketing measuring and optimizing performance at the account level.

ABM differs from inbound marketing in that it targets accounts as organizational entities rather than focusing primarily on individual leads. This approach reflects the different perspectives of marketing and sales functions: marketers often address individuals within organizations, while sales teams work with the broader buying group or the company as a whole.

Marketing teams can help build intelligence on key accounts. Peppers and Rogers (1993) wrote that "When two marketers are competing for the same customer’s business, all other things being equal, the marketer with the greatest scope of information about that particular customer […] will be the more efficient competitor."

== Account selection ==
A defining step in ABM is the identification of accounts to prioritize. Not all customers qualify as strategic or key accounts, and organizations typically base their selection on factors such as revenue potential, profitability, account history, and long-term strategic fit.

The Pareto Principle (80/20 rule) is often cited in this context, reflecting the idea that a small proportion of accounts may generate the majority of revenues.
