= Oxford Global Islamic Branding and Marketing Forum =

Market for Muslims

The Oxford Global Islamic Branding and Marketing Forum is a two-day forum that brings together over 250 business leaders, branding and marketing experts and thought leaders to discuss and understand the key issues that face the growth of the Muslim market.

== About the Forum ==
According to the Pew Research Center a comprehensive demographic study (Mapping the Global Muslim Population) of more than 200 countries finds that there are 1.57 billion Muslims of all ages living in the world today, representing 23% of an estimated 2009 world population of 6.8 billion. Not only is the Muslim population a significant percentage of the global population but AT Kearney also point out that the market for sharia compliant products or services – that is products and services that confirm to Islamic Law – totals US$2trillion annually and is growing rapidly.

As Muslim countries develop, there is an expressed need to develop and market their own brands to the rest of the world. Additionally, there is massive interest amongst non-Muslim companies in how to enter and penetrate this global market, which spans many industries, including finance, food and beverage, cosmetics, healthcare, pharmaceuticals, logistics, tourism, fashion, and others.

This Forum brings muslim leaders and companies from a variety of business sectors together to discuss how to develop better trade and business relations and to learn from each other about the markets involved and to facilitate an understanding of each other. The forum also focuses on marketing and branding for Muslim consumers. While this area of business is not yet standardized, it is a subject of further research and activity in the global environment.

Islam is one religion, but within the Islamic global population there are many markets that behave differently from cultural and business perspectives and both Muslim and non-Muslim marketers seek to understand these differences effectively to address their needs.

== Role Players ==
The confirmed role players include The Honourable Dato' Sri Mohd Najib Tun Razak, Prime Minister of Malaysia; H.E. Shaukat Aziz, former Prime Minister of Pakistan; Lord Nazir Ahmed, Life Peer of the House of Lords of the UK Parliament; Mr Miles Young, CEO of Ogilvy & Mather Worldwide; Rafi-uddin Shikoh, CEO, The Dinar Standard; Tan Sri Dato' H. Muhammad-Ali, President & CEO, Johor Corporation; Arif Zaman, Principal Consultant, Reputation Institute; Datuk Seri Farid Ridzuan, CEO, Media Prima, Malaysia

Issues in Islamic Branding & Marketing:

- "The Role of Muslim Nations in Rebuilding Today’s Global Economy."
- "Understanding Muslim Consumers: Are Muslims the Same the World Over? What are the Ethnographic, Demographic and Behavioural Similarities and Differences Across Global Muslim Markets ? Where is the Purchasing Power? What are the Implications for Branding and Marketing Strategies?"
- "Islamic Branding: The Next Big Thing? What are the best communications channels to reach Muslim markets? What should the media industry take into consideration?"
- "What is the role of e-business and new social networking media in Muslim communities in different Muslim countries?"
- "What are the Innovative Branding and Marketing Developments in Muslim Countries? Do 'Western' strategies apply?"

== Organiser ==
The organiser is the Executive Education Department of the Said Business School of the University of Oxford.
