= Hit rate =

Business metric

Hit rate is a metric or measure of business performance traditionally associated with sales. It is defined as the number of sales of a product divided by the number of customers who go online, planned call, or visit a company to find out about the product.

Sales can be measured either as the sum of dollars pursued or the number of deals pursued. Accurate calculation requires clear definition of when a sales opportunity is firm enough to be included in the metric, as well as firm disposition of the opportunity (i.e. the deal has reached a point where it is considered won, lost or abandoned).

The hit rate may be measured for the whole sales force or by sales region, sales person or product group. It may be used to benchmark the different sales periods and to benchmark the effectiveness of the own sales force with other companies of the same sector.

Due to the high costs involved with making proposals, the hit rate is a very useful tool especially for companies in industrial marketing.
