= Business-to-government =

Trade between the business sector as a supplier and a government body as a customer

Business-to-government (B2G), also referred to as business-to-public-administration (B2PA) or business-to-public-sector (B2PS), describes commercial transactions in which businesses supply goods or services to government entities acting as customers. Where governments contract directly with each other, the term government-to-government (G2G) is also used.

The concept is closely related to public procurement and may also include marketing activities directed toward government institutions at the local, regional, or national level through public relations, branding, advertising, and digital communications.

B2G is commonly discussed alongside business-to-consumer (B2C) and business-to-business (B2B) markets as one of the principal commercial interaction models. It integrates elements of business administration, public administration, marketing, communications, and political science to facilitate exchange between private-sector suppliers and public-sector organizations.

The B2G domain is relevant: the public sector represents 54% of EU GDP, and 47% of US GDP. Public sector procurement amounts to 14-20% of GDP. In the European Union, the public procurement market is 13.6% of the GDP, i.e. 2 trillion Euro, spent by 250,000 public authorities.

More than 60% of Fortune 1000 companies are active in the B2G market, with government customers generally having a positive impact on a firm’s value.

Public-sector organizations generally post tenders in the form of requests-for-proposals, requests-for-information, requests-for-quotations, and sources-sought, to which private suppliers respond. Business-to-government networks provide a platform for businesses to bid on government opportunities that are presented as solicitations, in the form of requests-for-proposals, through a reverse auction.

Government agencies typically have pre-negotiated standing contracts vetting the vendors/suppliers and their products and services for set prices. These can be local or national contracts, and some may be grandfathered in by other entities. For example, in the United States, California's MAS Multiple Award Schedule will recognize the federal government contract holder's prices on a General Services Administration Schedule.

== Government-to-government contracting ==
The UK government has signed two G2G agreements with the government of Peru, one to support delivery of the PanAmerican Games in Lima in 2019, and signed in 2020 one to support recovery after El Niño destruction in Peru in 2017. Contract management for the PanAmerican Games G2G is referred to as an example of professional contract management activity in a UK government management standards publication. In Canada, the Canadian Commercial Corporation is mandated to act as a prime contractor for government to government contracts, enabling Canadian businesses to supply overseas governments in a sub-contracting capacity.

== Digital procurement and e-procurement ==
Business-to-government activity increasingly takes place through digital procurement systems, often referred to as e-procurement. The OECD’s public procurement framework identifies e-procurement as one of the integrated principles of modern public procurement systems.

These systems may be used for publishing tender notices, providing procurement documents, submitting bids, evaluating tenders, awarding contracts, invoicing, and payment. International organizations have described e-procurement as a tool for improving transparency, efficiency, and accountability in public purchasing.

== See also ==
- DTC or B2C (direct-to-consumer or business-to-consumer / retail)
- B2B2C (business-to-business-to-consumer)
- Business marketing
- G2B
- Hit rate
- Industrial marketing
- Marketing
- Tendering
