= Macromarketing =

Field of marketing

Macromarketing is an interdisciplinary field that studies marketing as a provisioning technology of society. It focuses on marketing-society interactions including such topics as marketing systems, aggregate consumer behavior, market regulation, social responsibility, justice and ethics in markets, and sustainable marketing. By comparison, "micromarketing" deals with how firms decide what to make, how to market it, and how much to price it. Some of key topics include the tragedy of the commons, subliminal advertising, market symbolism and environmental sustainability. The notion of "marketing systems" is at the heart of macromarketing thought.

Macromarketing may be a fairly recent term, but the ideas and interests that it comprises have existed as long as human history. For example, History of the Peloponnesian War by Thucydides, Magna Carta, and The Travels of Marco Polo are works that embody macromarketing themes. Macromarketing practice moreover is perhaps as old as society itself. Societies emerged for the welfare of the group; the need for specialization and then exchanges of items produced by specialists surely was evident early on. Greater specialization and support for it begat trade, and eventually markets—which linked many systems in any given society, from production to consumption—were an efficient mechanism to sustain a society, which, fundamentally is a series of institutions and systems agreed upon by the members of the group. For example, even ancient markets like the agora in Athens or a bazaar in Mesopotamia would have been built on systemic organization and coordination, bringing people together.

Modern macromarketing literature on contemporary society may discuss topics like subliminal advertising, environmentally friendly packaging, and transgender consumers. Articles in the Journal of Macromarketing were about marketing ethics, how American muslims use social media to connect with verified halal markets, destination marketing and place branding in gastronomy, and how U.S. nonprofits are addressing the "wicked problem" of gun violence through macro-social marketing.

Macromarketing models are normative constructs, and the discipline that reflects society's value judgments and takes a stance on "how the general marketing process should be conducted in the best interests of society". Some scholars argued that "improving our knowledge of marketing" was a sort of "social process of resource mobilization that, among other things, focuses on an understanding of processes of social learning, adoption, and innovation". In fact, some scholars worried that it was falling out of the spotlight, perhaps because the field was seen as "the conscience of marketing practice", which was less appealing in an academia that values "objectivity and scientific enquiry". macromarketing focused on

Components of marketing thought
	Data	Theory	Normative models	Implementation
Micromarketing	Data of the firm	Theory of the firm	Plans for the firm (e.g., pro forma budgets)	Firm management, administration, control
Macromarketing	Overall data of the marketing system	Marketing theory	Social values, goals, programs	Public regulation, assistance, programs

== History ==
The term "macromarketing" was first used in 1962 by Robert Bartels in The Development of Marketing Thought, in which he "forecast future marketing developments, such as increasing conceptualization, more comparative study, more interdisciplinary research, and a 'new concept of macro-marketing'". Fifteen years later, he and Jenkins published their seminal 1977 article in the Journal of Marketing, where they wrote:

Macromarketing has meant the marketing process in its entirety, and the aggregate mechanism of institutions performing it. It has meant systems and groups of micro institutions, such as channels, conglomerates, industries, and associations, in contrast to their individual component units. More recently, it has meant the social context of micromarketing, its role in the national economy, and its application to the marketing of noneconomic goods.

The article won the Journal of Marketing's Harold H. Maynard Award for its "contribution to marketing thought and theory". Hunt (1981) defines macromarketing as “the study of (1) marketing systems, (2) the impact and consequences of marketing systems on society, and (3) the impact and consequences of society on marketing systems” (p. 7).

The Macromarketing Society, "an international group of scholars" that studies "matters related to the varied interactions among markets, marketing, and society", was founded in the 1970s. In 1976, Charles Slater organized the first Macro-Marketing Seminar at the University of Colorado at Boulder, which was followed by subsequent seminars from 1977 to 1979. In 1978, the Macro-Marketing Editorial Advisory Board was formed to come up with a policy for the Journal of Macromarketing. On August 9, 1979, the Advisory Board met again in Boulder, Colorado, and the Macromarketing Society came to be.

== Marketing Systems Research ==
The focus on marketing systems is a distinguishing aspect of macromarketing. The theoretical contribution of prof. Roger Layton in this area of research cannot be underestimated. Layton proposed MAS (mechanism, action, structure) theory of marketing systems. The MSPG (marketing systems as a public good) theory extends this research.

== The Macromarketing Society ==
The Macromarketing Society has held an Annual Macromarketing Conference since 1976 and has published the quarterly Journal of Macromarketing since 1981. It also liaises with organizations, governments, universities, and nonprofits that share an interest in macromarketing.

The Society is based on five pillars that "deeply matter" and affect everyone around the world:

- Markets, marketing, and society are part of a global network that determines human welfare, the economy, politics, and environment
- Market are especially influential; free markets are very advantageous but regulation is oftentimes necessary to uphold values like justice and sustainability
- Marketing as a discipline plays a key societal role by facilitating exchange and co-creating value
- The overarching macromarketing system shapes quality of life, well-being, environmental sustainability, and societal flourishing
- Political ideologies, normative ethics, technology, geography, and culture are embedded in every level of marketing
