= Håkan Håkansson =

Swedish organizational theorist

Håkan Håkansson (born 1947) is a Swedish organizational theorist, and Professor of International Management at the BI Norwegian Business School, known for his work on business networks.

== Biography ==
Håkansson attended the Technical High School in Örebro, where he graduated as engineer in 1967. He obtained his BS in Business Administration in 1970 at the Uppsala University, where in 1975 he also obtained his PhD in Business Administration with the thesis, entitled "Studies in Industrial Purchasing with special reference to Determinants of Communication Patterns."

In 1970 Håkansson started his academic career at the Department of Business Studies of the University of Uppsala as Lecturer, and got promoted associate professor in 1976. In 1983 he moved to the Stockholm School of Economics, where he taught for three years. He held a Special Research Position at the Social Science Research Council back in Uppsala from 1986 to 1993, and then was appointed Professor of Business Studies, especially Industrial Marketing at the University of Uppsala. In 2000 he moved to the BI Norwegian Business School in Oslo (BI Oslo), where he was Professor in Marketing for a year, and is Professor in International Management since 2001 at the Department of Innovation and Economic Organisation.

Håkansson has been Visiting Researcher and/or visiting professor at the University of Manchester Institute of Science and Technology in 1978; the University of Stanford in 1991; the Kellogg Graduate School, Northwestern University in 1991; the Norwegian School of Technology, Trondheim in 1993; Chalmers University of Technology, Gothenburg in 1994; the Norwegian School of Technology, Trondheim since 1997, at MIT in 1998, the Twente University since 1998, the University of Bath in 1999.

In 1976 Håkansson was one of the co-founders of the Industrial Marketing and Purchasing Group (IMP Group) and became one of its most noted representatives. In 1994 Håkansson is elected member of the Royal Swedish Academy of Engineering Sciences, and in 2010 he received the Herbert Simon Award.

== Work ==
Håkansson's research interests are in the field of "inter-organisational business relationships and business networks with particular focus on innovation and economic development."

=== Business networks ===
The central concept in the theory of business networks is the network concept. Håkansson and Snehota (1995) defined this as follows:

A network has no clear boundaries, nor any centre or apex. It exists as an ‘organization’ in terms of a certain logic affecting the ordering of activities, resources and actors.

Business networks evolve over time, according to Håkansson and Ford (2002):

The history of a business network is the process through which time and money have been devoted to build, adapt, develop, understand, relate and combine different human and physical resources together.

== Selected publications ==
- Håkansson, Håkan, Studies in Industrial Purchasing with special reference to Determinants of Communication Patterns, Doctoral thesis. Uppsala: Acta Universitatis Upsaliensis.
- Snehota, Ivan, IMP Group. International marketing and purchasing of industrial goods: An interaction approach. (1982).
- Håkansson, Håkan, ed. Industrial technological development: a network approach. London: Croom Helm, 1987.
- Snehota, Ivan, and Hakan Hakansson, eds. Developing relationships in business networks. Londres: Routledge, 1995.
- Ford, David, Lars-Erik Gadde, and Håkan Håkansson. Managing business relationships. (2003).

Articles, a selection

- Håkansson, Håkan, and Ivan Snehota. "No business is an island: the network concept of business strategy." Scandinavian Journal of Management 5.3 (1989): 187–200.
- Anderson, James C., Håkan Håkansson, and Jan Johanson. "Dyadic business relationships within a business network context." Journal of Marketing (1994): 1–15.
- Håkansson, Håkan, and David Ford. "How should companies interact in business networks?." Journal of Business Research 55.2 (2002): 133–139.
