= Marketing =

Study and process of exploring, creating, and delivering value to customers

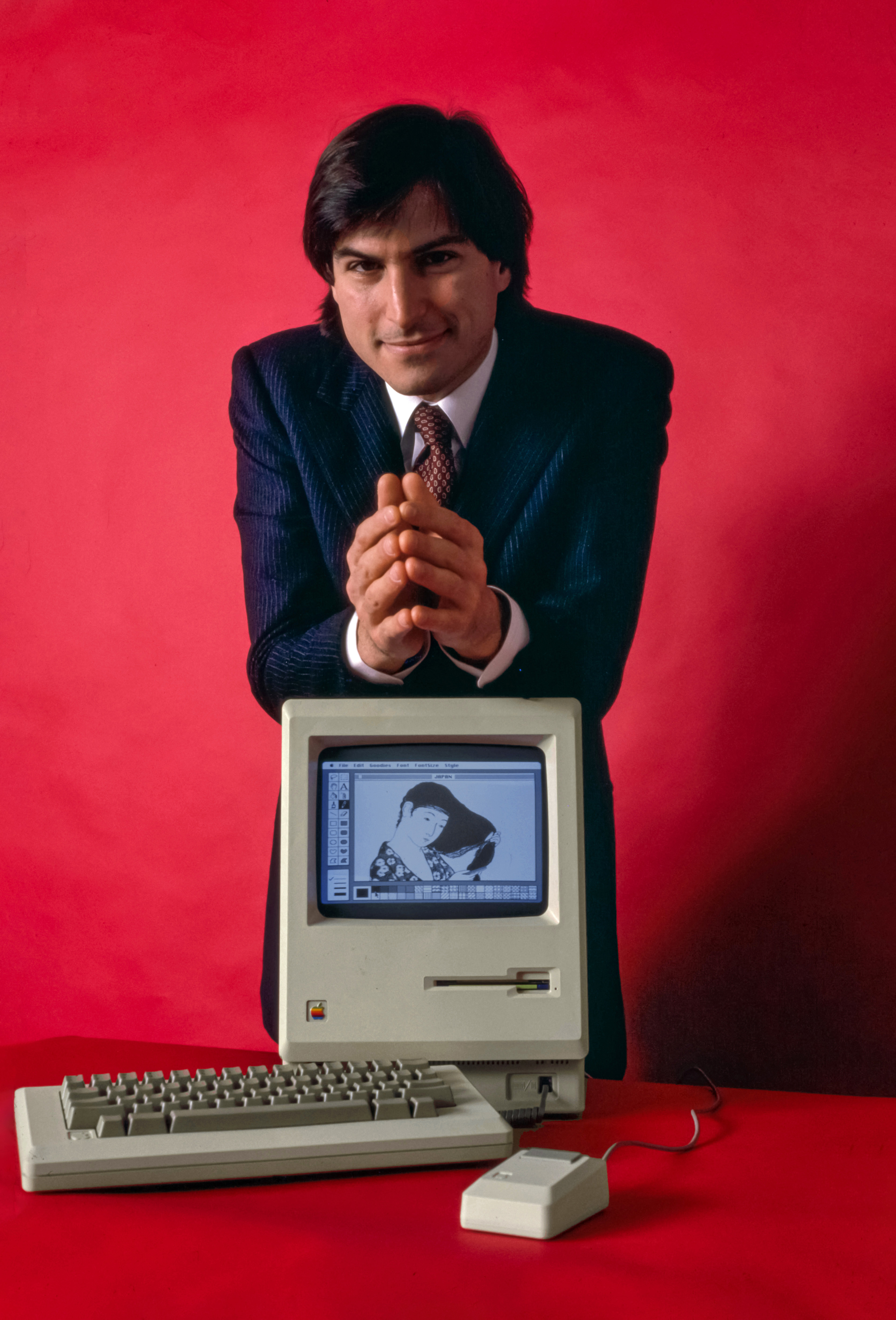
Steve Jobs's marketing skills have been credited for reviving Apple Inc. and turning it into one of the most valuable brands.

Marketing is the act of acquiring, satisfying and retaining customers. It is one of the primary components of business management and commerce.

Marketing is usually conducted by the seller, typically a retailer or manufacturer. Products can be marketed to other businesses (B2B) or directly to consumers (B2C). Sometimes tasks are contracted to dedicated marketing firms, like a media, market research, or advertising agency. Sometimes, a trade association or government agency (such as the Agricultural Marketing Service) advertises on behalf of an entire industry or locality, often a specific type of food (e.g. Got Milk?), food from a specific area, or a city or region as a tourism destination.

Market orientations are philosophies concerning the factors that should go into market planning. The marketing mix, which outlines the specifics of the product and how it will be sold, including the channels that will be used to advertise the product, is affected by the environment surrounding the product, the results of marketing research and market research, and the characteristics of the product's target market. Once these factors are determined, marketers must then decide what methods of promoting the product, including use of coupons and other price inducements.

== Definition ==
Marketing is currently defined by the American Marketing Association (AMA) as "the activity, set of institutions, and processes for creating, communicating, delivering, and exchanging offerings that have value for customers, clients, partners, and society at large". However, the definition of marketing has evolved over the years. The AMA reviews this definition and its definition for "marketing research" every three years. The interests of "society at large" were added into the definition in 2008. The development of the definition may be seen by comparing the 2008 definition with the AMA's 1935 version: "Marketing is the performance of business activities that direct the flow of goods, and services from producers to consumers". The newer definition highlights the increased prominence of other stakeholders in the new conception of marketing.

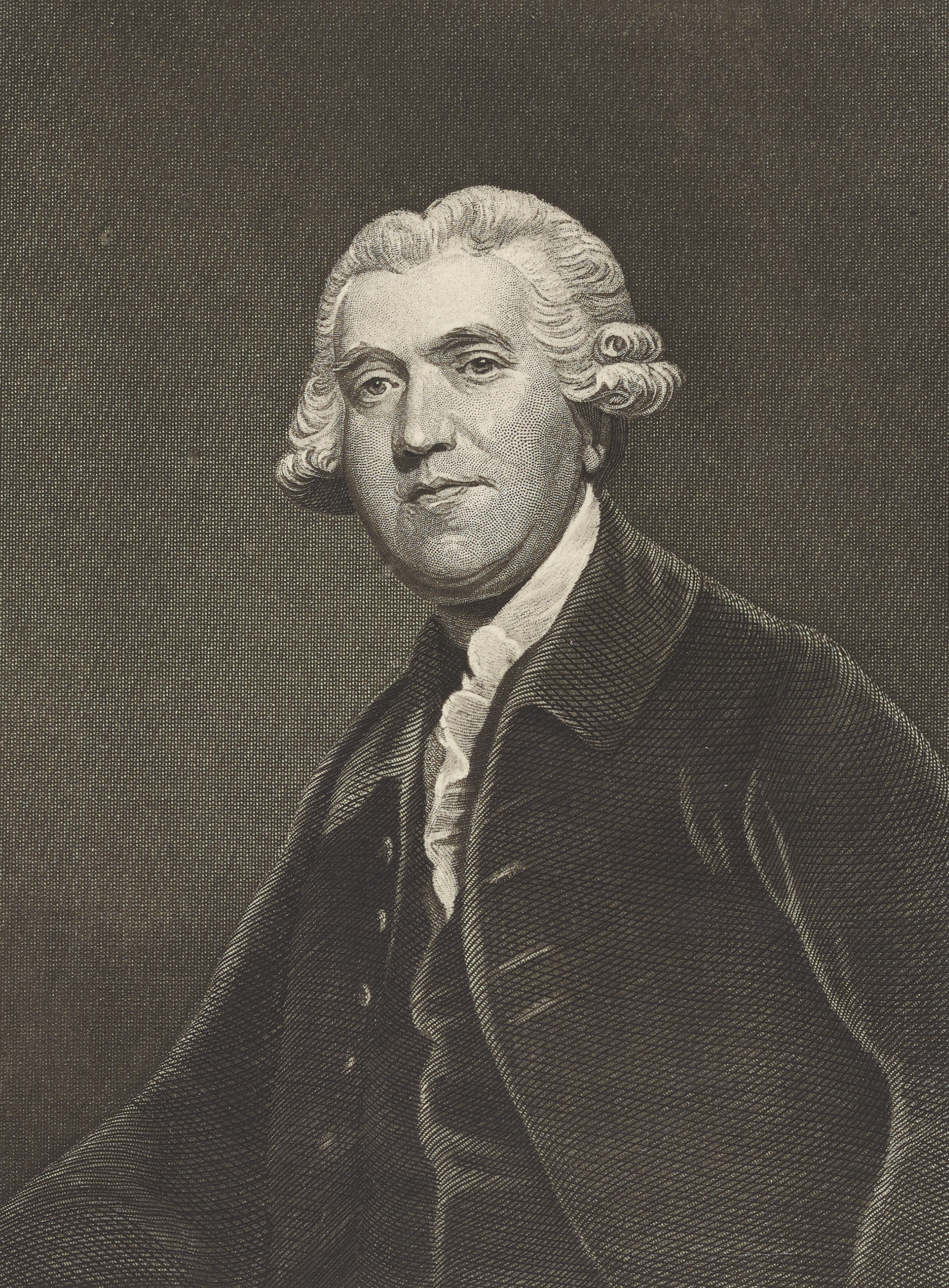
The 18th century retail entrepreneur Josiah Wedgwood, who devised a number of sales methods for his tableware, is "credited with inventing modern marketing" according to the Adam Smith Institute.

Recent definitions of marketing place more emphasis on the consumer relationship, as opposed to a pure exchange process. For instance, prolific marketing author and educator, Philip Kotler has evolved his definition of marketing. In 1980, he defined marketing as "satisfying needs and wants through an exchange process", and in 2018 defined it as "the process by which companies engage customers, build strong customer relationships, and create customer value in order to capture value from customers in return". A related definition, from the sales process engineering perspective, defines marketing as "a set of processes that are interconnected and interdependent with other functions of a business aimed at achieving customer interest and satisfaction".

Some definitions of marketing highlight marketing's ability to produce value to shareholders of the firm as well. In this context, marketing can be defined as "the management process that seeks to maximise returns to shareholders by developing relationships with valued customers and creating a competitive advantage". For instance, the Chartered Institute of Marketing defines marketing from a customer-centric perspective, focusing on "the management process responsible for identifying, anticipating and satisfying customer requirements profitably".

In the past, marketing practice tended to be seen as a creative industry, which included advertising, distribution and selling, and even today many parts of the marketing process (e.g. product design, art director, brand management, advertising, inbound marketing, copywriting etc.) involve the use of the creative arts. However, because marketing makes extensive use of social sciences, psychology, sociology, mathematics, economics, anthropology and neuroscience, the profession is now widely recognized as a science. Marketing science has developed a concrete process that can be followed to create a marketing plan.

== Concept ==
The "marketing concept" proposes that to complete its organizational objectives, an organization should anticipate the needs and wants of potential consumers and satisfy them more effectively than its competitors. This concept originated from Adam Smith's book The Wealth of Nations but would not become widely used until nearly 200 years later. Marketing and Marketing Concepts are directly related.

Given the centrality of customer needs, and wants in marketing, a rich understanding of these concepts is essential:

Needs: Something necessary for people to live a healthy, stable and safe life. When needs remain unfulfilled, there is a clear adverse outcome: a dysfunction or death. Needs can be objective and physical, such as the need for food, water, and shelter; or subjective and psychological, such as the need to belong to a family or social group and the need for self-esteem.
Wants: Something that is desired, wished for or aspired to. Wants are not essential for basic survival and are often shaped by culture or peer-groups.
Demands: When needs and wants are backed by the ability to pay, they have the potential to become economic demands.

Marketing research, conducted for the purpose of new product development or product improvement, is often concerned with identifying the consumer's unmet needs. Customer needs are central to market segmentation which is concerned with dividing markets into distinct groups of buyers on the basis of "distinct needs, characteristics, or behaviors who might require separate products or marketing mixes". Needs-based segmentation (also known as benefit segmentation) "places the customers' desires at the forefront of how a company designs and markets products or services". Although needs-based segmentation is difficult to do in practice, it has been proved to be one of the most effective ways to segment a market. In addition, a great deal of advertising and promotion is designed to show how a given product's benefits meet the customer's needs, wants or expectations in a unique way.

== B2B and B2C marketing ==
The two major segments of marketing are business-to-business (B2B) marketing and business-to-consumer (B2C) marketing.

=== B2B marketing ===
B2B (business-to-business) marketing refers to any marketing strategy or content that is geared towards a business or organization. Any company that sells products or services to other businesses or organizations (vs. consumers) typically uses B2B marketing strategies. The 7 P's of B2B marketing are product, price, place, promotion, people, process, and physical evidence. Some of the trends in B2B marketing include content such as podcasts, videos, and social media marketing campaigns.

Examples of products sold through B2B marketing include:

- Major equipment
- Accessory equipment
- Raw materials
- Component parts
- Processed materials
- Supplies
- Venues
- Business services

The four major categories of B2B product purchasers are:

- Producers - use products sold by B2B marketing to make their own goods (e.g.: Mattel buying plastics to make toys)
- Resellers - buy B2B products to sell through retail or wholesale establishments (e.g.: Walmart buying vacuums to sell in stores)
- Governments - buy B2B products for use in government projects (e.g.: purchasing weather monitoring equipment for a wastewater treatment plant)
- Institutions - use B2B products to continue operation (e.g.: schools buying printers for office use)

=== B2C marketing ===
Business-to-consumer marketing, or B2C marketing, refers to the tactics and strategies in which a company promotes its products and services to individual people.

Traditionally, this could refer to individuals shopping for personal products in a broad sense. More recently the term B2C refers to the online selling of consumer products.

B2C marketing focuses on appealing directly to consumers. It often uses tailored emotional marketing strategies towards individuals.

=== C2B marketing ===
Consumer-to-business marketing or C2B marketing is a business model where the end consumers create products and services which are consumed by businesses and organizations. It is diametrically opposed to the popular concept of B2C or business-to-consumer where the companies make goods and services available to the end consumers. In this type of business model, businesses profit from consumers' willingness to name their own price or contribute data or marketing to the company, while consumers benefit from flexibility, direct payment, or free or reduced-price products and services. One of the major benefit of this type of business model is that it offers a company a competitive advantage in the market.

=== C2C marketing ===
Customer to customer marketing or C2C marketing represents a market environment where one customer purchases goods from another customer using a third-party business or platform to facilitate the transaction. C2C companies are a new type of model that has emerged with e-commerce technology and the sharing economy.

=== Differences in B2B and B2C marketing ===
The different goals of B2B and B2C marketing lead to differences in the B2B and B2C markets. The main differences in these markets are demand, purchasing volume, number of customers, customer concentration, distribution, buying nature, buying influences, negotiations, reciprocity, leasing and promotional methods.

- Demand: B2B demand is derived because businesses buy products based on how much demand there is for the final consumer product. Businesses buy products based on customer's wants and needs. B2C demand is primarily because customers buy products based on their own wants and needs.
- Purchasing volume: Businesses buy products in large volumes to distribute to consumers. Consumers buy products in smaller volumes suitable for personal use.
- Number of customers: There are relatively fewer businesses to market to than direct consumers.
- Customer concentration: Businesses that specialize in a particular market tend to be geographically concentrated while customers that buy products from these businesses are not concentrated.
- Distribution: B2B products pass directly from the producer of the product to the business while B2C products may additionally go through a wholesaler or retailer.
- Buying nature: B2B purchasing is a formal process done by professional buyers and sellers, while B2C purchasing is informal.
- Buying influences: B2B purchasing is influenced by multiple people in various departments such as quality control, accounting, and logistics while B2C marketing is only influenced by the person making the purchase and possibly a few others.
- Negotiations: In B2B marketing, negotiating for lower prices or added benefits is commonly accepted while in B2C marketing (particularly in Western cultures) prices are fixed.
- Reciprocity: Businesses tend to buy from businesses they sell to. For example, a business that sells printer ink is more likely to buy office chairs from a supplier that buys the business's printer ink. In B2C marketing, this does not occur because consumers are not also selling products.
- Leasing: Businesses tend to lease expensive items while consumers tend to save up to buy expensive items.
- Promotional methods: In B2B marketing, the most common promotional method is personal selling. B2C marketing mostly uses sales promotion, public relations, advertising, and social media.

== Marketing management orientations ==
A marketing orientation has been defined as a "philosophy of business management", "a corporate state of mind", or an "organizational culture". Although scholars continue to debate the precise nature of specific concepts that inform marketing practice, the most commonly cited orientations are as follows:

- Product concept: mainly concerned with the quality of its product. It has largely been supplanted by the marketing orientation, except for haute couture and arts marketing.
- Production concept: specializes in producing as much as possible of a given product or service in order to achieve economies of scale or economies of scope. It dominated marketing practice from the 1860s to the 1930s, yet can still be found in some companies or industries. Specifically, Kotler and Armstrong note that the production philosophy is "one of the oldest philosophies that guides sellers... [and] is still useful in some situations".
- Selling concept: focuses on the selling/promotion of the firm's existing products, rather than developing new products to satisfy unmet needs or wants primarily through promotion and direct sales techniques, largely for "unsought goods" in industrial companies. A 2011 meta-analysis found that the factors with the greatest impact on sales performance are a salesperson's sales-related knowledge (market segments, presentation skills, conflict resolution, and products), degree of adaptiveness, role clarity, cognitive aptitude, motivation and interest in a sales role).
- Marketing concept: This is the most common concept used in contemporary marketing, and is a customer-centric approach based on products that suit new consumer tastes. These firms engage in extensive market research, use R&D (Research & Development), and then use promotion techniques. The marketing orientation includes:
  - Customer orientation: A firm in the market economy can survive by producing goods that people are willing and able to buy. Consequently, ascertaining consumer demand is vital for a firm's future viability and even existence as a going concern.
  - Organizational orientation: The marketing department is of prime importance within the functional level of an organization. Information from the marketing department is used to guide the actions of a company's other departments. A marketing department could ascertain (via marketing research) that consumers desired a new type of product, or a new usage for an existing product. With this in mind, the marketing department would inform the R&D department to create a prototype of a product/service based on consumers' new desires. The production department would then start to manufacture the product. The finance department may oppose required capital expenditures since it could undermine a healthy cash flow for the organization.
- Societal marketing concept: Social responsibility that goes beyond satisfying customers and providing superior value embraces societal stakeholders such as employees, customers, and local communities. Companies that adopt this perspective typically practice triple bottom line reporting and publish financial, social and environmental impact reports. Sustainable marketing or green marketing is an extension of societal marketing.

== Marketing plan ==
The area of marketing planning involves forging a plan for a firm's marketing activities. A marketing plan can also pertain to a specific product, the introduction of a new product, the revision of current marketing strategies for existing products, as well as an organisation's overall marketing strategy. The plan is created to accomplish specific marketing objectives, outlining a company's advertising and marketing efforts for a given period, describing the current marketing position of a business, and discussing the target market and marketing mix to be used to achieve marketing goals.

An organization's marketing planning process is derived from its overall business strategy. Marketing plans start by identifying customer needs through market research and how the business can satisfy these needs. The marketing plan also shows what actions will be taken and what resources will be used to achieve the planned objectives.

Marketing objectives are typically broad-based in nature, and pertain to the general vision of the firm in the short, medium or long-term. As an example, if one pictures a group of companies (or a conglomerate), the objective might be to increase the group's sales by 25% over a ten-year period.

== The marketing mix ==
A marketing mix is a foundational tool used to guide decision making in marketing. The marketing mix represents the basic tools that marketers can use to bring their products or services to the market. They are the foundation of managerial marketing and the marketing plan typically devotes a section to the marketing mix.

=== The 4Ps ===
The 4Ps refers to four broad categories of marketing decisions, namely: product, price, promotion, and place. The origins of the 4 Ps can be traced to the late 1940s. The first known mention has been attributed to a Professor of Marketing at Harvard University, James Culliton.

The 4 Ps, in its modern form, was first proposed in 1960 by E. Jerome McCarthy; who presented them within a managerial approach that covered analysis, consumer behavior, market research, market segmentation, and planning. Phillip Kotler, popularised this approach and helped spread the 4 Ps model. McCarthy's 4 Ps have been widely adopted by both marketing academics and practitioners.

One version of the marketing mix is the 4Ps method.

==== Outline ====
Product
The product aspects of marketing deal with the specifications of the actual goods or services, and how it relates to the end-user's needs and wants. The product element consists of product design, new product innovation, branding, packaging, and labeling. The scope of a product generally includes supporting elements such as warranties, guarantees, and support. Branding, a key aspect of the product management, refers to the various methods of communicating a brand identity for the product, brand, or company.
Pricing
This refers to the process of setting a price for a product, including discounts. The price need not be monetary; it can simply be what is exchanged for the product or services, e.g. time, energy, or attention or any sacrifices consumers make in order to acquire a product or service. The price is the cost that a consumer pays for a product—monetary or not. Methods of setting prices are in the domain of pricing science.
Place (or distribution)
This refers to how the product gets to the customer; the distribution channels and intermediaries such as wholesalers and retailers who enable customers to access products or services in a convenient manner. This third P has also sometimes been called Place or Placement, referring to the channel by which a product or service is sold (e.g. online vs. retail), which geographic region or industry, to which segment (young adults, families, business people), etc. also referring to how the environment in which the product is sold in can affect sales.

Promotion
This includes all aspects of marketing communications: advertising, sales promotion, including promotional education, public relations, personal selling, product placement, branded entertainment, event marketing, trade shows, and exhibitions. Common examples of advertising media include: TV, Radio, Magazines, Online, Billboards, Event sponsorship, Advertising mail (direct mail), Transit ads. Social media is used to facilitate two-way communication between companies and their customers. Outlets such as Facebook, Instagram, Twitter, Reddit, Pinterest, Snapchat, TikTok. LinkedIn and YouTube allow brands to start a conversation with regular and prospective customers. Viral marketing can be facilitated by social media. This fourth P is focused on providing a message to get a response from consumers. The message is designed to persuade or tell a story to create awareness.

==== Criticisms ====
One of the limitations of the 4Ps approach is its emphasis on an inside-out view. An inside-out approach is the traditional planning approach where the organization identifies its desired goals and objectives, which are often based around what has always been done. Marketing's task then becomes one of "selling" the organization's products and messages to the "outside" or external stakeholders. In contrast, an outside-in approach first seeks to understand the needs and wants of the consumer.

From a model-building perspective, the 4 Ps has attracted a number of criticisms. Well-designed models should exhibit clearly defined categories that are mutually exclusive, with no overlap. Yet, the 4 Ps model has extensive overlapping problems. Several authors stress the hybrid nature of the fourth P, mentioning the presence of two important dimensions, "communication" (general and informative communications such as public relations and corporate communications) and "promotion" (persuasive communications such as advertising and direct selling). Certain marketing activities, such as personal selling, may be classified as either promotion or as part of the place (i.e., distribution) element. Some pricing tactics, such as promotional pricing, can be classified as price variables or promotional variables and, therefore, also exhibit some overlap.

Other important criticisms include that the marketing mix lacks a strategic framework and is, therefore, unfit to be a planning instrument, particularly when uncontrollable, external elements are an important aspect of the marketing environment.

==== Modifications and extensions ====
To overcome the deficiencies of the 4Ps model, some authors have suggested extensions or modifications to the original model. Extensions of the four P's are often included in cases such as services marketing where unique characteristics (i.e. intangibility, perishability, heterogeneity and the inseparability of production and consumption) warrant additional consideration factors. Other extensions include "people", "process", and "physical evidence", i.e. 7 Ps, which are often applied in the case of services marketing. Alternative extensions have been found necessary in retail marketing, industrial marketing and internet marketing.

=== The 4Cs ===
In response to environmental and technological changes in marketing, as well as criticisms towards the 4Ps approach, the 4Cs has emerged as a modern marketing mix model. Robert F. Lauterborn proposed a 4 Cs classification in 1990. His classification is a more consumer-orientated version of the 4 Ps that attempts to better fit the movement from mass marketing to niche marketing.

==== Outline ====
Consumer (or client)

The consumer refers to the person or group that will acquire the product. This aspect of the model focuses on fulfilling the wants or needs of the consumer.

Cost

Cost refers to what is exchanged in return for the product. Cost mainly consists of the monetary value of the product. Cost also refers to anything else the consumer must sacrifice to attain the product, such as time or money spent on transportation to acquire the product.

Convenience

Like "Place" in the 4Ps model, convenience refers to where the product will be sold. This, however, not only refers to physical stores but also whether the product is available in person or online. The convenience aspect emphasizes making it as easy as possible for the consumer to attain the product, thus making them more likely to do so.

Communication

Like "Promotion" in the 4Ps model, communication refers to how consumers find out about a product. Unlike promotion, communication not only refers to the one-way communication of advertising, but also the two-way communication available through social media.

== Environment ==
The term "marketing environment" relates to all of the factors (whether internal, external, direct or indirect) that affect a firm's marketing decision-making/planning. A firm's marketing environment consists of three main areas, which are:

- The macro-environment (Macromarketing), over which a firm holds little control, consists of a variety of external factors that manifest on a large (or macro) scale. These include: economic, social, political and technological factors. A common method of assessing a firm's macro-environment is via a PESTLE (Political, Economic, Social, Technological, Legal, Ecological) analysis. Within a PESTLE analysis, a firm would analyze national political issues, culture and climate, key macroeconomic conditions, health and indicators (such as economic growth, inflation, unemployment, etc.), social trends/attitudes, and the nature of technology's impact on its society and the business processes within the society.
- The micro-environment, over which a firm holds a greater amount (though not necessarily total) control, typically includes: Customers/consumers, Employees, Suppliers and the Media. In contrast to the macro-environment, an organization holds a greater (though not complete) degree of control over these factors.
- The internal environment, which includes the factors inside of the company itself. A firm's internal environment consists of: Labor, Inventory, Company Policy, Logistics, Budget, and Capital Assets.

== Research ==
Marketing research is a systematic process of analyzing data that involves conducting research to support marketing activities and the statistical interpretation of data into information. This information is then used by managers to plan marketing activities, gauge the nature of a firm's marketing environment and to attain information from suppliers. A distinction should be made between marketing research and market research. Market research involves gathering information about a particular target market. As an example, a firm may conduct research in a target market, after selecting a suitable market segment. In contrast, marketing research relates to all research conducted within marketing. Market research is a subset of marketing research. (Avoiding the word consumer, which shows up in both, market research is about distribution, while marketing research encompasses distribution, advertising effectiveness, and salesforce effectiveness).

The stages of research include:

- Define the problem
- Plan research
- Research
- Interpret data
- Implement findings

Well-known academic journals in the field of marketing with the best rating in VHB-Jourqual and Academic Journal Guide, an impact factor of more than 5 in the Social Sciences Citation Index and an h-index of more than 130 in the SCImago Journal Rank are

- Journal of Consumer Research
- Journal of Marketing
- Journal of Marketing Research
- Marketing Science

These are also designated as Premier AMA Journals by the American Marketing Association.

== Segmentation ==
Market segmentation consists of taking the total heterogeneous market for a product and dividing it into several sub-markets or segments, each of which tends to be homogeneous in all significant aspects. The process is conducted for two main purposes: better allocation of a firm's finite resources and to better serve the more diversified tastes of contemporary consumers. A firm only possesses a certain amount of resources. Thus, it must make choices (and appreciate the related costs) in servicing specific groups of consumers. Moreover, with more diversity in the tastes of modern consumers, firms are noting the benefit of servicing a multiplicity of new markets.

Market segmentation can be defined in terms of the STP acronym, meaning Segmentation, Targeting, and Positioning.

Segmentation involves the initial splitting up of consumers into persons of like needs/wants/tastes. Commonly used criteria include:

- Geographic (such as a country, region, city, town)
- Psychographic (e.g. personality traits or lifestyle traits which influence consumer behaviour)
- Demographic (e.g. age, gender, socio-economic class, education)
- Gender
- Income
- Life-Cycle (e.g. Baby Boomer, Generation X, Millennial, Generation Z)
- Lifestyle (e.g. tech savvy, active)
- Behavioral (e.g. brand loyalty, usage rate)

Once a segment has been identified to target, a firm must ascertain whether the segment is beneficial for them to service. The DAMP acronym is used as criteria to gauge the viability of a target market. The elements of DAMP are:

- Discernable – how a segment can be differentiated from other segments.
- Accessible – how a segment can be accessed via Marketing Communications produced by a firm
- Measurable – can the segment be quantified and its size determined?
- Profitable – can a sufficient return on investment be attained from a segment's servicing?

The next step in the targeting process is the level of differentiation involved in a segment serving. Three modes of differentiation exist, which are commonly applied by firms. These are:

- Undifferentiated – where a company produces a like product for all of a market segment
- Differentiated – in which a firm produced slight modifications of a product within a segment
- Niche – in which an organization forges a product to satisfy a specialized target market

Positioning concerns how to position a product in the minds of consumers and inform what attributes differentiate it from the competitor's products. A firm often performs this by producing a perceptual map, which denotes similar products produced in the same industry according to how consumers perceive their price and quality. From a product's placing on the map, a firm would tailor its marketing communications to meld with the product's perception among consumers and its position among competitors' offering.

== Product life cycle ==
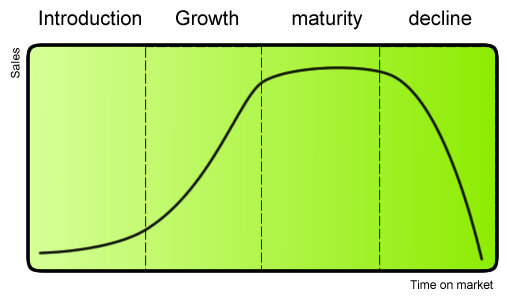
Product lifecycle, with the assumption of four major phases: introduction, growth, maturity, and decline. Curve of sales as a function of the time of the product on the market. After a plateau in sales at product maturity, a steep decline can follow.

The product life cycle (PLC) is a tool used by marketing managers to gauge the progress of a product, especially relating to sales or revenue accrued over time. The PLC is based on a few key assumptions, including:

- A given product would possess introduction, growth, maturity, and decline stage
- No product lasts perpetually on the market
- A firm must employ differing strategies, according to where a product is on the PLC

In the introduction stage, a product is launched onto the market. To stimulate the growth of sales/revenue, use of advertising may be high, in order to heighten awareness of the product in question.

During the growth stage, the product's sales/revenue is increasing, which may stimulate more marketing communications to sustain sales. More entrants enter into the market, to reap the apparent high profits that the industry is producing.

When the product hits maturity, its starts to level off, and an increasing number of entrants to a market produce price falls for the product. Firms may use sales promotions to raise sales.

During decline, demand for a good begins to taper off, and the firm may opt to discontinue the manufacture of the product. This is so, if revenue for the product comes from efficiency savings in production, over actual sales of a good/service. However, if a product services a niche market, or is complementary to another product, it may continue the manufacture of the product, despite a low level of sales/revenue being accrued.

== Ethics ==
Marketing ethics is an area of applied ethics that examines the moral principles and standards governing the practice and regulation of marketing. It addresses ethical issues arising in areas such as advertising, promotion, pricing, product development, and distribution. Certain aspects of marketing ethics, particularly advertising and promotional practices, overlap with media ethics and public relations ethics.

== See also ==
- Account-based marketing
- Advertising
  - History of advertising
  - Online Advertising
  - Sex in Advertising
- Advertising management
- Affinity marketing
- Agile marketing
- American business history
- B2B Marketing
- Brand awareness
- Consumer confusion
- Consumer behaviour
- Content marketing
- Database marketing
- Demand chain
- Digital marketing
- Email remarketing
- Family in advertising
- Guerrilla marketing
- History of marketing
- Internet marketing
- List of marketing terms
- Loyalty marketing
- Macromarketing
- Marketing management
- Marketing mix
- Marketing science
- Marketing strategy
- Micromarketing
- Media manipulation
- Meta marketing
- Mobile marketing
- Multicultural marketing
- Product management
- Product marketing
- Production orientation
- Public Sector Marketing
- Real-time marketing
- Return on marketing investment (ROMI)
- Relationship marketing
- Search Engine Marketing
- Services marketing
- Smarketing
- Societal marketing
- Social media marketing
- Sustainable market orientation
- Visual marketing
- Viral Marketing
- Web marketing
- Word-of-mouth marketing

=== Types of marketing ===
- Agricultural marketing
- Business marketing and industrial marketing
- Destination marketing
- Global marketing
- Influencer marketing
- Relationship marketing
- Services marketing
- Social marketing

=== Marketing orientations or philosophies ===
- Marketing orientation
- Production orientation
- Selling orientation
- Socially responsible marketing and corporate social responsibility
- Relationship marketing and customer relationship management

== Bibliography ==
- Bartels, Robert, The History of Marketing Thought, Columbus, Ohio, Grid, (1976) 1988 online
- Christensen, Clayton M. (1997). The innovator's dilemma: when new technologies cause great firms to fail. Boston, Massachusetts, US: Harvard Business School Press. ISBN 978-0-87584-585-2.
- Church, Roy; Godley, Andrew (2003). Church, Roy; Godley, Andrew (eds.). The Emergence of Modern Marketing. Frank Cass. Archived from the original on 18 October 2009 – via Questia.
- Hollander, Stanley C.; Rassuli, Kathleen M.; Jones, D. G. Brian; Dix, Laura Farlow (June 2005). "Periodization in Marketing History". Journal of Macromarketing. 25 (1): 32–41. doi:10.1177/0276146705274982.
- Tedlow, Richard S., and Jones, Geoffrey G. (eds), The Rise and Fall of Mass Marketing, Routledge, 2014
- Weitz, Barton A. and Robin Wensley (eds). Handbook of Marketing, 2002
