= Industrial Marketing and Purchasing Group =

The Industrial Marketing and Purchasing Group or International Marketing and Purchasing Group (abbreviated IMP Group) is a European research initiative in the field of Industrial marketing established in 1976 by researchers from different countries and universities in Europe. It has evolved into an "informal international group of scholars concerned with developing concepts and knowledge in the field of business-to-business marketing and purchasing", and is also concerned with marketing and purchasing in a business-to-consumer context. The group is also called the Nordic school of marketing.

== History ==
In 1976 the Industrial Marketing and Purchasing Group started as a joint research project of scientists for the Swedish University of Uppsala, the British University of Bath and University of Manchester Institute of Science and Technology, the French Ecole Superieure de Commerce, Lyon (now EMLYON Business School), and the German LMU Munich. The IMP Group (2010) explained:

The first IMP Group research project was developed on the basis of empirical observations which did not fit into the mainstream economic theories’ assumption about an atomistic market: Industrial marketing and purchasing appeared to take place within stable, long-term business relationships. But why do companies develop these interdependencies? What benefits could outweigh the drawbacks of being dependent on others? These and other related research questions have triggered many empirical studies over the past three decades of the “doing of business”, carried out by increasing numbers of researchers. These scholars have investigated a wide variety of interactions between individual companies and organisations as well as the wider network that surrounds them. These empirical studies, including issues such as marketing, purchasing, technological development, management, logistics, business communities and policy all challenge mainstream business theory and call for theoretical tools that allow investigations of the interactive aspects of the business landscape.

The initial research of the IMP Group, as Stephen Young acknowledged, added "significantly to the knowledge of how companies in industrial markets develop their international activities and what has contributed to the success of companies". Möller and Wilson (1995) mentioned that this "work of the IMP Group can be accessed through Hakansson (1982) and Ford (1990)".

In 2012 Rider et al. confirmed that "the work of the IMP Group is reported in some dozen books, about 2,000 papers and more than 130 Ph.D. studies", based on data from the IMP Group website in 2009.

In 2018, when the IMP Journal and the Journal of Business and Industrial Marketing were merged, an IMP Forum was established which publishes IMP-related research. Up to 4 papers are published per issue, subject to the oversight of an independent editorial team.
