= Industrial marketing =

Industrial marketing or business-to-business marketing is the marketing of goods and services by one business to another. Industrial goods are those an industry uses to produce an end product from one or more raw material. The term industrial marketing has largely been replaced by the term business-to-business marketing (B2B).

== Origins and usage ==
Historically, the marketing discipline made a distinction between industrial marketing and consumer goods marketing. Recognising the importance of knowing who was responsible for industrial buying decisions, John Frederick wrote in 1934:

The major objective of all [industrial] marketing is to contact the man who actually brings about the purchase decision, regardless of his position or title.

During the 1980s, businesses shifted from industrial marketing to business marketing, although in 1989 Daniel McQuiston was still able to claim that the primary marketing objective remained "virtually the same" as it had been in 1934.

Within a decade, the term business marketing had largely displaced industrial marketing. By the late 1990s, the term B2B marketing came into widespread use.

== Industrial or business-to-business (B2B) marketing ==
Main features of the B2B selling process are:

- Marketing is one-to-one in nature. Discovering who to develop a marketing relationship with and identifying the critical factors influencing decision-making are important capabilities.
- Highly professional and trained people in buying processes are involved. In many cases, two or three decision makers must approve a purchase plan.
- Often the buying or selling process is complex, and includes many stages (for example, request for proposal, request for tender, selection process, awarding of tender, contract negotiations, and signing of final contract).
- Selling activities involve long processes of prospecting, qualifying, wooing, making representations, preparing tenders, developing strategies, and contract negotiations.

== Blurring between B2B and B2C ==
Industrial marketing can cross into consumer marketing (B2C). For example, an electronic component seller may distribute its products through industrial marketing channels (see Channel (marketing)), but also support consumer sales. Many products are equally desired by business and consumers, such as audio products, furniture, paint, hardware, etc. Nonetheless, manufactures and service providers frequently maintain separate industrial and consumer marketing operations to reflect the different needs of the two channels.

== Competitive tendering ==
Industrial marketing often involves competitive tendering. This is a process where a purchasing organization undertakes to procure goods and services from suitable suppliers. Due to the high value of some purchases (for example buying a new computer system, manufacturing machinery, or outsourcing a maintenance contract) and the complexity of such purchases, the purchasing organization will seek to obtain a number of bids from competing suppliers and choose the best offering. An entire profession (strategic procurement) that includes tertiary training and qualifications has been built around the process of making important purchases. The key requirement in any competitive tender is to ensure that:

- The business case for the purchase has been completed and approved.
- The purchasing organization's objectives for the purchase are clearly defined.
- The procurement process is agreed upon and it conforms with fiscal guidelines and organizational policies.
- The selection criteria have been established.
- A budget has been estimated and the financial resources are available.
- A buying team (or committee) has been assembled.
- A specification has been written.
- A preliminary scan of the market place has determined that enough potential suppliers are available to make the process viable (this can sometimes be achieved using an expression of interest process).
- It has been clearly established that a competitive tendering process is the best method for meeting the objectives of this purchasing project. If (for example) it was known that there was only one organisation capable of supplying; best to get on with talking to them and negotiating a contract.

Because of the significant value of many purchases, issues of probity arise. Organisations seek to ensure that awarding a contract is based on "best fit" to the agreed criteria, and not bribery, corruption, or incompetence.

== Bidding process ==
Suppliers who are seeking to win a competitive tender go through a bidding process. At its most primitive, this would consist of evaluating the specification (issued by the purchasing organization), designing a suitable proposal, and working out a price.

== Industrial buying journey ==
Before industrial buyers engage in the bidding process, they go through a long and distinct buying journey. A 2018 study conducted by Thomasnet.com and the research firm Strategyn revealed that the industrial buying process involves 15 distinct steps that ultimately align industrial manufacturers' and suppliers' marketing activities to the buying cycle, making it more successful. This is very similar to the inbound process of inbound marketing.

== Non-tender purchasing ==
Tender processes are time consuming and expensive, particularly when executed with the aim of ensuring probity. Government agencies are particularly likely to utilise elaborate competitive tendering processes due to the expectation that they should be seen at all times to be responsibly and accountably spending public money. Private companies are able to avoid the complexity of a fully transparent tender process but are still able to run the procurement process with some rigour.

== Solution selling ==
B2B firms make extensive use of solution selling where sales force identify the client's problem or needs and sell goods or services that specifically address those needs. In solution selling, it is essential that sales staff explore the client's requirements in depth before presenting a solution.

Marketing supports solution selling through methods like account-based marketing—understanding a specific target organization's requirements as the foundation of a marketing program. As research shows, sales success is heavily weighted towards suppliers who understand the customer. In UK research, 77 per cent of senior decision-makers believe new suppliers' marketing approaches are poorly targeted and make it easy to justify staying with current suppliers).

Sales force management has a critical function in industrial selling, where it assumes a greater role than other parts of the marketing mix. Typical industrial organisations depend on the ability of their sales people to build relationships with customers. During periods of high demand (economic boom), sales forces often become mere order takers and struggle to respond to customer requests for quotations and information. However, when economic downturn hits it becomes critical to direct the sales force outward to sell.

== From cannon fodder to preferred tenderer ==
The term "cannon fodder" derives from the World wars and refers to the massing of undertrained and recently recruited troops sent to the fronts to face the enemy. Such troops invariably had a poor survival rate but provided the tactical advantage of distracting the enemy while professional soldiers mounted more effective operations. In adopting the term to Industrial Marketing it means those bids being submitted that have no chance of winning but are involved to make up the numbers (you can't have only one bid in a "competitive" tender process; that wouldn't satisfy the requirements of probity) (for example in government tenders, or for private enterprise the requirement to "truly test the market" and to "keep them honest"). The reader might be wondering why anybody would go to all of the work of submitting a tender when they had no chance of winning; for the same reason that troops were sent into battle to die; they thought they had a real chance.

== Indicators ==
In industrial marketing personal selling is still very effective because many products must be customized to suit the requirements of the individual customer. Indicators such as the sales tunnel give information on the expected sales in the near future, the hit rate indicates whether the sales organization is busy with promising sales leads or it is spending too much effort on projects that are eventually lost to the competition or that are abandoned by the prospect.

== The Internet and B2B marketing ==
The dot-com boom and bust of the late 1990s saw significant attempts to develop online shopping. Many entrepreneurs (and their investors) discovered that merely having a website (no matter how innovative) was insufficient to generate sales. The amount of conventional media advertising required to promote the sites burnt cash at a faster rate than on-line sales generated. They also presumed that consumers would eschew the conventional shopping experience (driving, parking, poor service etc.) for the convenience of shopping on-line. Some did, but for many companies, not in sufficient numbers. There were many unforeseen problems, and apart from some notable exceptions (Amazon.com and others) the business to consumer online failed for many companies. B2B selling, however, more frequently achieved impressive results.

== See also ==
- Business marketing
- Business-to-government marketing
- Hit rate
- Marketing
