= Business network =

Complex network of companies, working together to accomplish certain objectives

A business network is a complex, enduring, and interdependent web of business relationships among market and non-market actors that allow firms to co-create value in their business environment. Firms influence their markets by managing and signalling their network positions, facilitating entry of new actors, or removing other actors, for instance, through disintermediation, which means eliminating the middleman.

When some actors within a business network have joint strategic intents and work together to achieve certain objectives, then the network is called a strategic business net. These objectives, which are strategic and operational, are adopted by business networks based on their role in the market.

== Definition ==
Several descriptions of business networks stipulate different types of characteristics:

- A business network is a form of inter-firm cooperation that allows companies, located in different regions or countries, to collaborate on a basis of common development objectives expressed in a cooperation agreement. The companies decide to join their strengths, share information and create synergies to become more innovative and competitive in domestic and international markets, while keeping their autonomy, not creating a separate legal entity. This cooperation model is suitable for any kind of business activity or sector.
- A business network is greater than the sum of the individual businesses. It incorporates suppliers, customers, third-party developers, distributors, and others. These third parties generally have a strong reason to support the network and remain active in it.
- A business network is generic and includes both smart and not-so-smart business networks. A smart business network is defined as a group of participating companies (nodes) that are linked together by one or many communication networks (links). The companies have compatible goals and interact in innovative ways. A smart business network is perceived by each company as increasing its own value and is sustainable as a network over time.
- A business network is owned by the business enterprise, where the scope of the network is to support the informational and operational requirements of the business, such as marketing, sales, accounting, and manufacturing departments.

== Study ==
In the late 20th century, the study of business networks emerged in the field of industrial markets. Researchers analyzed the transactions and communications beneath the visible flows of products, inquiries, sales visits and negotiations, and beyond the visible growth and prosperity of some companies and the failure of others.

Snehota and Hakansson (1995) explain: For more than twenty years, we have analyzed business networks for answers to the many questions about industrial markets. Unlike consumer markets, industrial markets are not generally known to the public, nor to many management scholars. We have been surprised by the complexity of industrial markets and at the same time by the apparent smoothness of their working. Gradually, we have acquired respect for their importance and complexity and learned how they work.

Another study on business networks was carried out by Ecorys between 2013 and 2014. This study was specific to EU-level business networks and was financed by the European Commission. The main objective of the study was to investigate and highlight the new forms of inter-firm collaboration and to propose possible measures to support and coordinate them in Europe where and if appropriate. This study included the objectives and categorization of business networks.

== Objectives ==
Business networks have two types of objectives — strategic and operational — that are adopted depending on the role of the business network in the market.

=== Strategic objectives ===
Strategic objectives are focused on long term activities, such as:

- Innovation
- Internationalization
- Foreign matchmaking

=== Operational objectives ===
Operational objectives are diverse and include:

- Provision of legal and financial services
- Collaboration in regional, national, and international projects
- Increased buying power through joint purchasing
- Optimization of HR-marketing for recruitment of highly specialized talent
- Introductions to new business partners and customers
- Provision of intellectual property protection

== Categorization ==
Business networks can be divided into two main categories: business associations and company aggregations.

=== Business associations ===
Business associations — also called business networks as business associations — provide member companies with a platform and conditions for cooperation to meet an objective. The companies decide if they want to cooperate to achieve that objective.

Business associations create a level playing field for cooperation among companies. They have a stable and well-functioning governance structure. The members may pay a fee to the association. In return, the business association monitors and meets the needs of their members and proactively develops and provides new services. This is the key task of business associations.

Business associations provide services that are generally more professional, extensive, and cost effective compared to services offered by individual members.

Figure 1: Relationship between the business association and its members, and among the members.

In a business association, there is a direct link between the business association (central body) and each of its constituent members. This is displayed with solid bidirectional arrows (refer to Figure 1). The members may or may not choose to cooperate with each other, displayed with dashed lines between companies.

Business associations are further categorized by sector or by location and scope.

=== Company aggregations ===
Company aggregations — also called business networks as company aggregations — are formed by companies, which decide to cooperate and aggregate. Unlike business associations, these companies have already taken the decision to work together on a joint set of objectives.

In a company aggregation, companies collaborate directly with each other without a representative and/or a servicing association. The aggregation of the companies can be formalized through a business contract.

Figure 2: Company aggregations have two forms of cooperation: horizontal and vertical.

Company aggregations have two forms of cooperation: horizontal and vertical. (refer to Figure 2)

- In a vertical aggregation, there is a collaboration between companies that are involved in different stages of the value chain. For example, cooperation between a supplier of cotton, a manufacturer of cotton clothes, a wholesale distributor, and a retailer of cotton clothes.
- In a horizontal aggregation, the collaboration is among companies of the same industry and in the same stage of the production process. For example, many small producers of cotton clothes cooperate and produce together the required number of cotton clothes to fulfill the order of a large marketing company.

== Business network model ==
The characteristics of a business network model are:

- The collaborating companies in a business network are not bound by location, size, sector, or number. They are open to new partnerships that help them to stay competitive.
- The companies focus on a joint objective and agree on the activities and the procedure to achieve the objectives.
- The collaborating companies formalize their agreement through a contract that includes the jointly agreed objectives, activities, procedures, duration, decision process, definition of the parties’ rights, and provisions to enter and exit the contract.
- The structured collaboration resulting from the contract gives the companies the required skills to become more competitive, innovative and global, and gain better economic productivity and performance. It also gives the companies the advantage of free riding.

Business network companies — that is, platform and network-based companies — outperform traditional companies. Some of the advantages of business network companies are:

- More profit
- Faster growth
- Higher valuations (two to four times)
- Higher return on investment
- Lower marginal costs

Some companies that follow a business network model include Trepup, eBay, Red Hat, Visa, Uber, TripAdvisor, Alibaba.

== Difference between business networks, clusters, and joint ventures ==
=== Difference between clusters and business networks ===
Clusters are a network of connected businesses, suppliers, and associates in a specific field that are all located in the same geographical area.

Conversely, companies in a business network are not bound by geographical locations or sectors, and can be focused around any specific objective.

=== Difference between joint ventures and business networks ===
A joint venture is a new legal entity created by two or more companies, generally characterized by shared ownership, shared returns and risks, and shared governance. The companies come together to accomplish a specific task, such as a project or a business activity.

In a business network, on the other hand, the autonomy of each of the companies is preserved and no new legal entity is formed. The companies capitalize on the network to create opportunities and expand their individual business interests.

== See also ==
- Business networking
- Conglomerate (company)
- Network marketing
