= Cause-related loyalty marketing =

Cause-related loyalty marketing is a recent trend in cause marketing. As the name implies, it is the marriage of cause marketing and loyalty programs. Cause marketing occurs when for-profit companies join forces with nonprofits to promote a cause. Recent examples include Nike, Inc. partnering with Livestrong, athlete Lance Armstrong’s cancer-fighting foundation, and Eastman Kodak teaming with stationery designer Bonnie Marcus in support of Breast Cancer Awareness Month. Cause-related loyalty marketing takes these donations and corporate social responsibility efforts one step further, wedding them to thousands of customer loyalty programs. Rather than requiring the outlay of funds from donors, cause-related loyalty marketing “recycles” loyalty program members’ unused points or miles. It then converts them into usable currency for a cause of the loyalty members’ choosing.

== Business applications ==
With consumer spending still depressed following the Great Recession, with an adjusted-for-inflation 2011 uptick of just one-tenth of a percent from 2010, companies put more effort into retaining loyal, high price-point customers. While loyalty programs are one way to achieve that aim through traditional points and rewards, cause-related loyalty marketing taps into increasingly cause-conscious consumers' tendency to patronize companies that support social causes. In an age where the US alone recycles 45 million tons of paper (as of 2010), re-purposing unused loyalty points or miles fits in with that new level of worldwide consciousness.

== How it works ==
Today, merging an existing loyalty program with a cause-related marketing campaign requires a business-to-business technology platform that supports a consumer-facing website. For example, KULA Causes Inc., of Boulder, Colorado, operates an online platform that enables companies to manage loyalty-program content and gather customer metrics while allowing loyalty customers to donate unused points, miles or other rewards to any of 2.5 million nonprofit organizations in 50 countries.

== Benefits ==
=== For companies ===
Any cause-related loyalty marketing platform tracks every transaction from beginning to end, with the data allowing companies to get to know their customers better through their buying habits and the types of causes they tend to support. This information allows them to tailor their efforts in order to achieve greater return on investment and build more meaningful customer relationships through a personalized loyalty program.

=== For consumers ===
Humans’ hard-wired capacity for empathy fuels the desire to help those in need, because people can imagine themselves in the same situation. Consumers acting on this impulse benefit from the positive feelings associated with charitable giving, a phenomenon supported by recent research published in the Journal of Consumer Psychology. This, in turn, increases the positive feelings a customer associates with the company or organization that channels the donation, which increases loyalty.

=== For nonprofits ===
In a cause-related loyalty marketing platform, nonprofits are generally able to build detailed profiles similar to those found on a social networking service. Nonprofits can use these profiles to tell their stories and showcase their work through essays, articles, photos, videos and other postings. In a cause-related loyalty marketing context, nonprofits benefit from detailed profiles (there is usually a free "basic" profile and paid "premium" profiles incorporating more features) that tell their individual stories through essays and articles, photos and videos as well as from exposure to a pool of millions of potential new donors. A cause-related loyalty marketing platform generally provides a simple search mechanism so loyalty customers can find the nonprofits they want to support while allowing them to share their in-platform activities with their social networks. This can benefit nonprofits by exposing them to a larger base of potential donors.

== See also ==
- Corporate social responsibility
- Cause-related marketing
- Socially responsible marketing
- Social marketing
- Societal marketing
- Sustainability marketing
