= State-owned enterprise =

Government entity

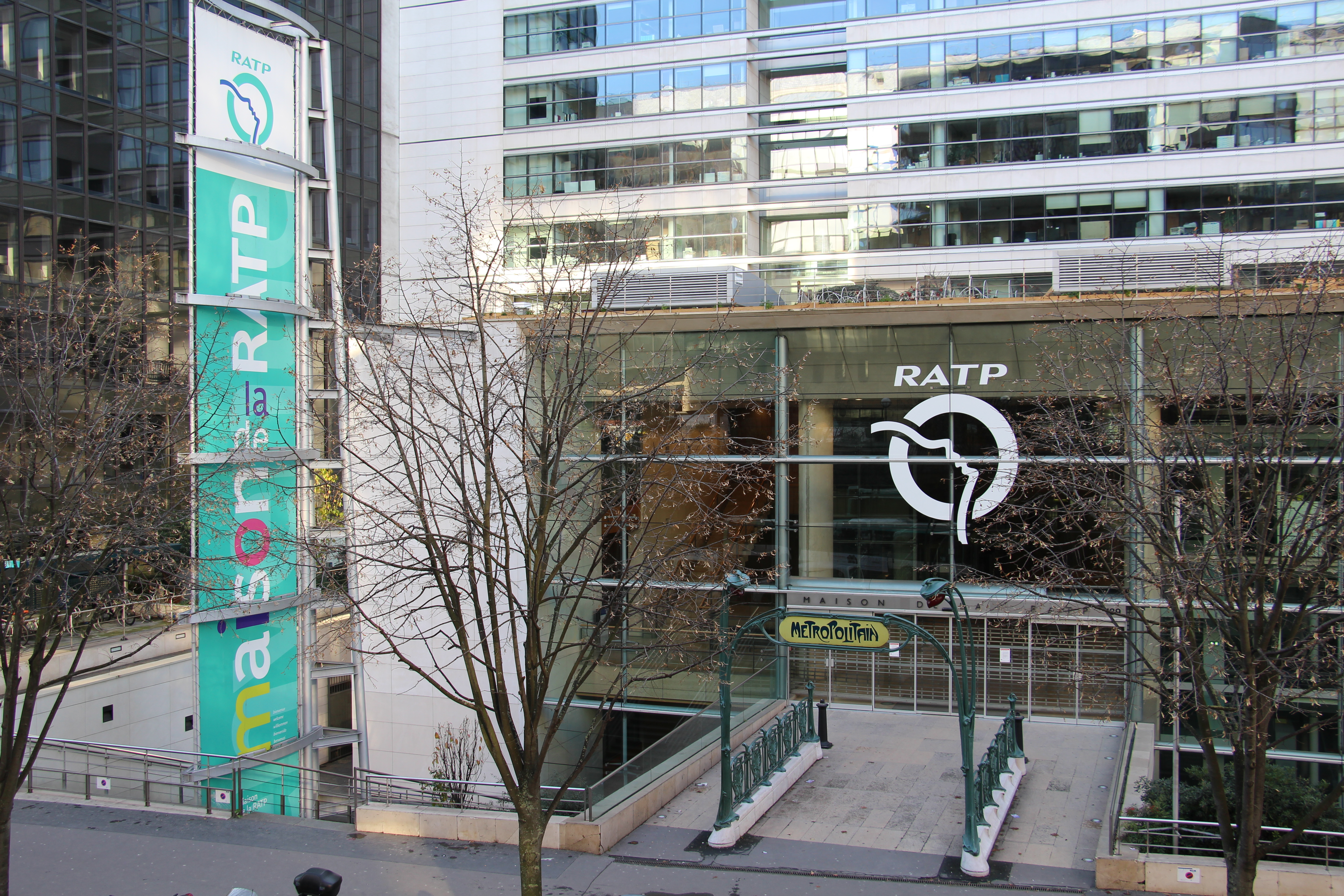
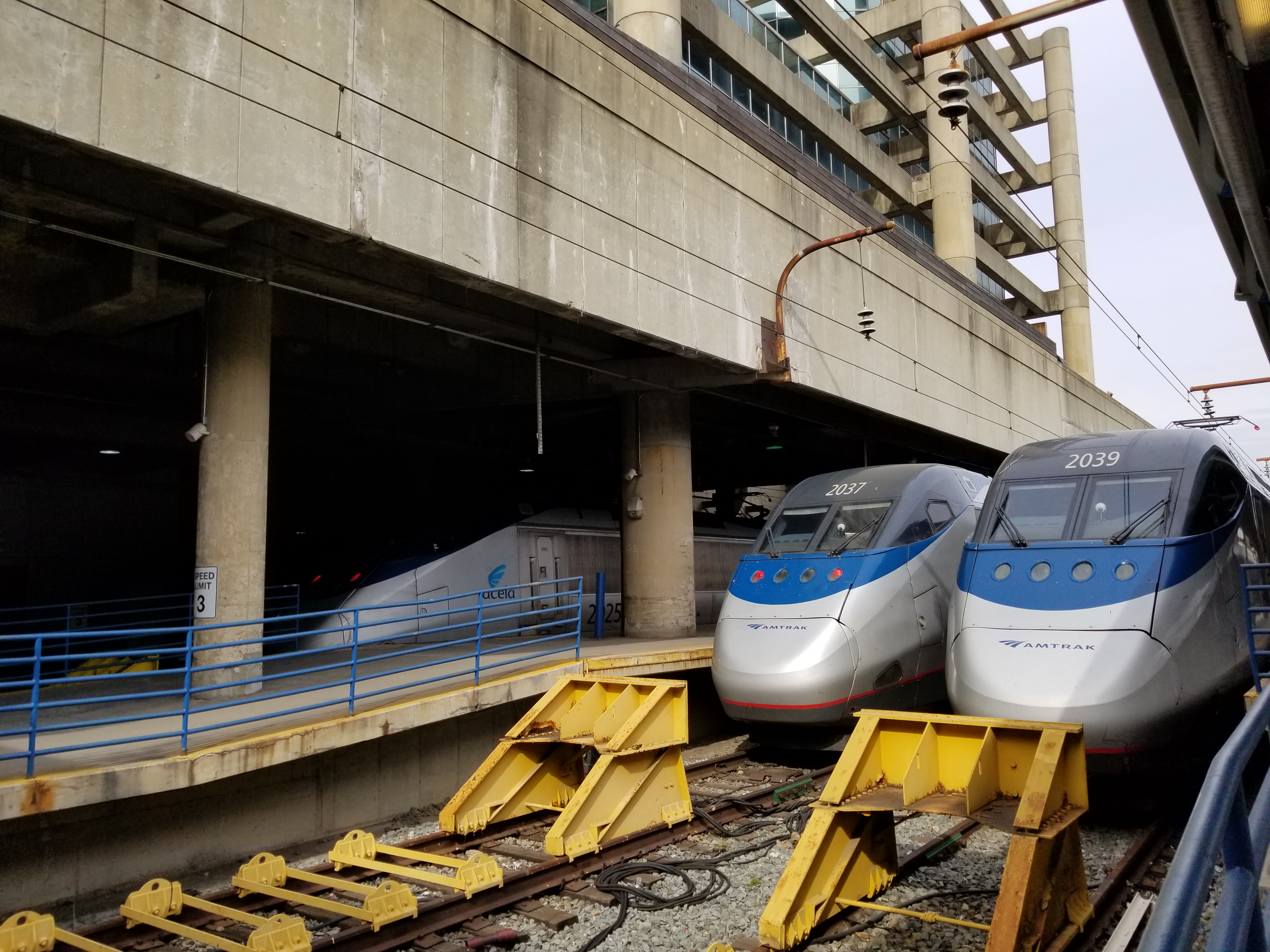
Many public transport operators like RATP Group (top) and Amtrak (bottom) are considered state-owned enterprises.

A state-owned enterprise (SOE) or government-owned enterprise is a business entity created or owned by a central or local government, either through an executive order or legislation. SOEs aim to generate profit for the government, prevent private sector monopolies, provide goods at lower prices, implement government policies, or serve remote areas where private businesses are scarce. The government typically holds full or majority ownership and oversees operations. SOEs have a distinct legal structure, with financial and developmental goals, like making services more accessible while earning profit (such as a state railway). They can be considered as government-affiliated entities designed to meet commercial and state capitalist objectives. The act of turning a part of publicly owned or governmental organizations into a SOE is called corporatization.

== Terminology ==
SOEs are known under many other terms: state-owned company, state-owned entity, state enterprise, publicly owned corporation, government business enterprise, public enterprise, government-owned company, government controlled company, government controlled enterprise, government-owned corporation, government-sponsored enterprise, commercial government agency, state-privatised industry public sector undertaking, or parastatal, among others. In some Commonwealth realms, ownership by the Crown is highlighted in the predominant local terminology, with SOEs in Canada referred to as a "Crown corporation", and in New Zealand as a "Crown entity".

The term "government-linked company" (GLC) is sometimes used, for example in Malaysia, to refer to private or public (listed on a stock exchange) corporate entities in which the government has a direct controlling stake.

== Economic theory ==
In economic theory, the question of whether a firm should be owned by the state or by the private sector is studied in the theory of incomplete contracts developed by Oliver Hart and his co-authors. In a world in which complete contracts were feasible, ownership would not matter because the same incentive structure that prevails under one ownership structure could be replicated under the other ownership structure. Hart, Shleifer, and Vishny (1997) have developed the leading application of the incomplete contract theory to the issue of state-owned enterprises. These authors compare a situation in which the government is in control of a firm to a situation in which a private manager is in control. The manager can invest to come up with cost-reducing and quality-enhancing innovations. The government and the manager bargain over the implementation of the innovations. If the negotiations fail, the owner can decide about the implementation. It turns out that when cost-reducing innovations do not harm quality significantly, then private firms are to be preferred. Yet, when cost-reductions may strongly reduce quality, state-owned enterprises are superior. Hoppe and Schmitz (2010) have extended this theory in order to allow for a richer set of governance structures, including different forms of public-private partnerships.

== Use ==
=== Economic reasons ===
==== Monopolies ====
SOEs are common in cases of natural monopolies, where a single firm can supply the whole market at a lower cost than multiple firms, due to economies of scale. For that reason, SOEs often operate in network industries, such as transport (e.g., railways), energy (e.g., electricity or gas supply), telecommunications, postal services, and banking. Also, an SOE may achieve a public objective by supplying services at a level or price that is socially beneficial, whereas a privately owned monopoly may not.

SOEs also often operate in the domain of strategic goods and services (e.g., arms manufacturing and procurement), politically sensitive business, broadcasting, demerit goods (e.g., alcoholic beverages), and merit goods (healthcare).

==== Infant industries ====
SOEs can also help foster industries that are "considered economically desirable and that would otherwise not be developed through private investment". When nascent or 'infant' industries have difficulty getting investments from the private sector (perhaps because the goods that are being produced requires very risky investments, when patenting is difficult, or when spillover effects exist), the government can help these industries get on the market with positive economic effects. However, the government cannot necessarily predict which industries would qualify as such 'infant industries', and so the extent to which this is a viable argument for SOEs is debated.

=== Political reasons ===
SOEs can be used to improve efficiency of public service delivery or as a step towards (partial) privatization or hybridization. SOEs can also be a means to alleviate fiscal stress, as SOEs may not count towards states' budgets.

== Effect ==
=== Compared to government bureaucracy ===
Compared to publicly owned enterprises under government oversight, SEOs operate more independently from policy choices of individual administrations. However, since SEOs operate at arm's length from the government, there is less democratic oversight and increased transaction costs (such as monitoring costs, i.e., it is more difficult and costly to govern and regulate an autonomous SOE than it is the public bureaucracy). Evidence suggests that existing SOEs are typically more efficient than government bureaucracy, but that this benefit diminishes as services get more technical and have less overt public objectives.

=== Compared to regular enterprises ===
Compared to a regular enterprise, state-owned enterprises are typically expected to be less efficient due to political interference, but unlike profit-driven enterprises they are more likely to focus on government objectives and meeting the needs of society.

== Around the world ==
=== Asia ===
==== OPEC countries ====
In most OPEC countries, the governments own the oil companies operating on their soil. A notable example is the Saudi Arabian national oil company, Saudi Aramco, which the Saudi government bought in 1988, changing its name from Arabian American Oil Company to Saudi Arabian Oil Company. The Saudi government also owns and operates Saudi Arabian Airlines, and owns 70% of SABIC as well as many other companies.

==== China ====
China's state-owned enterprises are owned and managed by the State-owned Asset Supervision and Administration Commission (SASAC). China's state-owned enterprises generally own and operate public services, resource extraction or defense. As of 2017, China has more SOEs than any other country, and the most SOEs among large national companies.

China's SOEs perform functions such as: contributing to central and local governments revenues through dividends and taxes, supporting urban employment, keeping key input prices low, channeling capital towards targeted industries and technologies, supporting sub-national redistribution to poorer interior and western provinces, and aiding the state's response to natural disasters, financial crises and social instability.

China's SOEs are at the forefront of global seaport-building, and most new ports constructed by them are done within the auspices of the Belt and Road Initiative.

==== India ====
In India, government enterprises exist in the form of Public Sector Undertakings (PSUs).

==== Japan ====
During the Meiji era, Japan developed modern industry through direct state intervention. Government-owned enterprises were important to the development of key economic sectors like railways.

After Japan invaded Manchuria in 1931 and occupied the region, Japan took over Chinese public enterprises in Manchuria (many of which originated from the Zhang Zuolin and Zhang Xueliang regimes) and converted them to state-owned enterprises of the Japanese puppet-state of Manchukuo.

==== Malaysia ====
The Malaysian government launched a GLC Transformation Programme for its linked companies and linked investment companies (GLICs) on 29 July 2005, aiming over a ten-year period to transform these businesses into "high-performing entities". The Putrajaya Committee on GLC High Performance (PCG), which oversaw this programme, was chaired by the Prime Minister, and membership included the Minister of Finance II, the Minister in the Prime Minister's Department in charge of the Economic Planning Unit, the Chief Secretary to the Government, Secretary General of Treasury and the heads of each of the GLICs (the Employees Provident Fund, Khazanah Nasional Berhad, Lembaga Tabung Angkatan Tentera (the armed forces pension fund), Lembaga Tabung Haji and Permodalan Nasional Berhad. Khazanah Nasional Berhad provided the secretariat to the PCG and managed the implementation of the programme, which was completed in 2015.

==== Philippines ====
For the 2024 financial year, Landbank of the Philippines is the most profitable state-owned enterprise in the Philippines, overtaking the 2023 leader Philippines Amusement and Gaming Corporation (PAGCOR) The latter as of 2023, was the third-largest contributor to government revenues, following taxes and customs.

=== Africa ===
==== Ethiopia ====
As of at least 2024, Ethiopian Airlines is Africa's largest and most profitable airline, as well as Ethiopia's largest earner of foreign exchange.

=== Europe ===
In Eastern and Western Europe, there was a massive nationalization throughout the 20th century, especially after World War II. In the Eastern Bloc, countries adopted very similar policies and models to the USSR. Governments in Western Europe, both left and right of centre, saw state intervention as necessary to rebuild economies shattered by war. Government control over natural monopolies like industry was the norm. Typical sectors included telecommunications, electric power, fossil fuels, iron ore, railways, airlines, media, postal services, banks, and water (sometimes called the commanding heights of the economy). Many large industrial corporations were also nationalized or created as government corporations, including, among many others: British Steel Corporation, Equinor, and Águas de Portugal.

As of 2024, multiple European countries have dedicated ministries and agencies to manage their state-run enterprises, e.g. the Agence des participations de l'État in France.

A state-run enterprise may operate differently from an ordinary limited liability corporation. For example, in Finland, state-run enterprises (liikelaitos) are governed by separate laws. Even though responsible for their own finances, they cannot be declared bankrupt; the state answers for the liabilities. Stocks of the corporation are not sold and loans have to be government-approved, as they are government liabilities.

==== Belarus ====
State-owned enterprises are a major component of the economy of Belarus. The Belarusian state-owned economy includes enterprises that are fully state-owned, as well as others which are joint-stock companies with partial ownership by the state. Employment in state-owned or state-controlled enterprises is approximately 70% of total employment. State-owned enterprises are thus a major factor behind Belarus's high employment rate and a source of stable employment.

=== North America ===
In North America, government-owned companies operate across a variety of sectors, including transportation, energy, finance, and media.

==== United States ====
In the United States, government-owned corporations typically operate in areas considered natural monopolies or those regarded as vital to the country's infrastructure, such as postal services, Amtrak railways, and public utilities. U.S. government-owned enterprises are most often structured as independent agencies or government corporations, which are expected to operate efficiently while serving public needs. Examples include the United States Postal Service, Tennessee Valley Authority, Federal National Mortgage Association (Fannie Mae), and Intel, in which the U.S. government holds a partial stake to boost domestic semiconductor production.

== See also ==
- Corporatism
- Dirigisme
- List of government-owned airlines
- List of government-owned companies
- Nationalization
- Public bodies
- Public ownership
- Quango
- State capitalism
- Statutory body
- Volkseigener Betrieb
