= Marketing ethics =

Area of applied ethics

Marketing ethics is an area of applied ethics that examines the moral principles and standards governing the practice and regulation of marketing. It addresses ethical issues arising in areas such as advertising, promotion, pricing, product development, and distribution. Certain aspects of marketing ethics, particularly advertising and promotional practices, overlap with media ethics and public relations ethics.

Marketing ethics is commonly analyzed from both descriptive and normative perspectives. Descriptive, or positive, marketing ethics examines existing marketing practices and documents ethical issues such as misleading or fraudulent advertising. Normative marketing ethics evaluates how marketing ought to be conducted and draws on ethical theories to establish standards for responsible practice. Ethical analysis in marketing is often informed by broader frameworks in business ethics, including duty-based theories, virtue ethics, and utilitarianism.

== Fundamental issues ==
=== Frameworks of analysis ===
- Value-oriented framework, analyzing ethical problems on the basis of the values which they infringe (e.g. honesty, autonomy, privacy, transparency). An example of such an approach is the American Marketing Association Code of Ethics.
- Stakeholder-oriented framework, analyzing ethical problems on the basis of whom they affect (e.g. consumers, competitors, society as a whole).
- Process-oriented framework, analyzing ethical problems in terms of the categories used by marketing specialists (e.g. research, price, promotion, placement).

However, none of these frameworks, by itself, allows a convenient and complete categorization of the variety of issues in marketing ethics.

=== Power-based analysis ===
Contrary to popular impressions, not all marketing is adversarial, and not all marketing is stacked in favor of the marketer. In marketing, the relationship between producer/consumer or buyer/seller can be adversarial or cooperative. For an example of cooperative marketing, see relationship marketing. If the marketing situation is adversarial, another dimension of difference emerges, describing the power balance between producer/consumer or buyer/seller. Power may be concentrated with the producer (caveat emptor), but factors such as over-supply or legislation can shift the power towards the consumer (caveat vendor). Identifying where the power in the relationship lies and whether the power balance is relevant are important in understanding the background to an ethical dilemma in marketing ethics.

=== Anti-marketing stance ===
A popularist anti-marketing stance commonly discussed in the blogosphere and popular literature is that any kind of marketing is inherently evil. The position is based on the argument that marketing necessarily commits at least one of three wrongs:

- Damaging personal autonomy: The victim of marketing in this case is the intended buyer whose right to self-determination is infringed.
- Causing harm to competitors: Fierce competition and unethical marketing tactics are especially associated with saturated markets.
- Manipulating social values: The victim in this case is either the environment or the society as a whole. The argument is that marketing promotes consumerism and waste. See also: affluenza, ethical consumerism, anti-consumerism.

== Specific issues ==
=== Market research ===
Market research is the collection and analysis of information about consumers, competitors and the effectiveness of marketing programs. With market research, businesses can make decisions based on the responses of the market, leading to a better understanding of how the business should adapt to the changing market. It is used to establish which portion of the population will or does purchase a product, based on age, gender, location, income level, and many other variables. This research allows companies to learn more about past, current, and potential customers, including their specific likes and dislikes. Meticulous codes of ethics have been devised by multiple professional institutions which aim to communicate conflicts that occur during the implementation of marketing research (The European Society of Marketing and Opinion Research, the Market Research Society, and the Council for Survey Research are a few examples).

Ethical danger points in market research include:

- Invasion of privacy.
- Stereotyping.
- Profit motive

Invasion of privacy

Without information from the public, it is difficult to do market research. As companies conduct research, they also come into contact with confidential and personal information, which comes with a level of risk for both the business as well as the individual. At times this information can be sensitive and in the wrong hands, ethical abuse and misuse of sensitive data may happen. This is why the invasion of consumer privacy is still an issue in marketing research ethics. Today's consumers are bombarded with mail after using their email address to enter in a competition, thus becoming part of a business's mailing list. Therefore, companies are provided with critical information which they must not take advantage of but use in an ethical manner.

Stereotyping:

Portraying an ideal body, weight, or physical appearance can have potentially harmful effects on individuals, such as low self-esteem or anorexia. Good marketing is ethical marketing; it is about pleasing customers and developing strong relationships with them in an ethical and humanitarian manner, without focusing too much on generating profit.

People affected by unethical market research include the public, respondents, clients, and researchers Approaches to privacy can broadly be divided into two categories: free market, and consumer protection.[31] In a free market approach, commercial entities are largely allowed to do what they wish, with the expectation that consumers will choose to do business with corporations that respect their privacy to a desired degree. If some companies are not sufficiently respectful of privacy, they will lose market share. In contrast, in a consumer protection approach, it is claimed that individuals may not have the time or knowledge to make informed choices, or may not have reasonable alternatives available. Stereotyping occurs because any analysis of real populations needs to make approximations and place individuals into groups. However, if conducted irresponsibly, stereotyping can lead to a variety of ethically undesirable results. In the American Marketing Association Statement of Ethics, stereotyping is countered by the obligation to show respect ("acknowledge the basic human dignity of all stakeholders").

Profit motive:

Manipulation of information and personal data can take place during market research conducted by for-profit organizations because they have a profit motive. This motive can affect the accuracy and objectivity of the marketing research and create an exaggerated positive image of the organization's products and services in order to attract clients to invest in their business.

=== Market audience ===
Ethical danger points include:

- Excluding potential customers from the market: selective marketing is used to discourage demand from undesirable market sectors or disenfranchise them altogether.
- Targeting the vulnerable (e.g. children, the elderly).

Examples of unethical market exclusion or selective marketing are past industry attitudes to the gay, ethnic minority and plus size markets. Contrary to the popular myth that ethics and profits do not mix, the tapping of these markets has proved highly profitable. For example, 20% of US clothing sales are now plus-size. Another example is the selective marketing of health care, so that unprofitable sectors (i.e. the elderly) will not attempt to take benefits to which they are entitled. A further example of market exclusion is the pharmaceutical industry's exclusion of developing countries from AIDS drugs.

Examples of marketing which unethically targets the elderly include: living trusts, time share fraud, mass marketing fraud and others. The elderly hold a disproportionate amount of the world's wealth and are therefore the target of financial exploitation.

In the case of children, the main products are unhealthy food, fashionware and entertainment goods. Children are a lucrative market: "...children 12 and under spend more than $11 billion of their own money and influence family spending decisions worth another $165 billion", but are not capable of resisting or understanding marketing tactics at younger ages ("children don't understand persuasive intent until they are eight or nine years old"). At older ages competitive feelings towards other children are stronger than financial sense. The practice of extending children's marketing from television to the school grounds is also controversial (see marketing in schools). The following is a select list of online articles:

- Sharon Beder, Marketing to Children (University of Wollongong, 1998).
- Miriam H. Zoll, Psychologists Challenge Ethics of Marketing to Children, (2000).
- Donnell Alexander and Aliza Dichter, Ads and Kids: How young is too young?
- Rebecca Clay, Advertising to children: Is it ethical? (Monitor on Psychology, Volume 31, No. 8 September 2000), American Psychological Association
- Media Awareness Network. How marketers target kids.

Other vulnerable audiences include emerging markets in developing countries, where the public may not be sufficiently aware of skilled marketing ploys transferred from developed countries, and where, conversely, marketers may not be aware how excessively powerful their tactics may be. See Nestle infant milk formula scandal. Another vulnerable group are mentally unstable consumers. The definition of vulnerability is also problematic: for example, when should endebtedness be seen as a vulnerability and when should "cheap" loan providers be seen as loan sharks, unethically exploiting the economically disadvantaged?

Targeting the vulnerable

Marketing targeting strategies for products that may cause economic, physical, and psychological harm have become an aspect of marketing that is criticized considerably, especially in marketing literature, with a particular focus on vulnerable consumers.

Children, elderly consumers, and economically disadvantaged consumers are often categorized as being a part of the vulnerable group in marketing, in terms of ethics. “Ethics and social responsibility communities seem to agree that targeting a vulnerable group with marketing campaigns that take advantage of their vulnerability is unjust”. George G Brenkert was amongst the first to raise the issue about taking advantage of the vulnerability of a person, which therefore makes marketing practices immoral or unjust. Adolescents and children in the US are major market force in the food and beverage industry and as a result, food marketers are “attracted to the youth as consumers because of their spending power, purchasing influences and as future adult consumers”.

It is ethically wrong to target children especially when it comes to unhealthy food and beverages, as children may not want anything else, which could lead to child obesity. Children have difficulty deciding between the purpose of advertising and other modes of communication; therefore it is morally unacceptable to target vulnerable children with such products. In Belgium, it is banned to show commercials during children's programs, similarly in Australia, such ads are not allowed during television programs for preschoolers. It is considered unethical to generate profits through marketing to vulnerable groups, such as children, the poor or the elderly.

The ethics of marketing practices, especially those directed toward vulnerable consumers, can be divided into two areas: product and process.

Process-related ethical issues are often demonstrated through the use of deceptive or misleading advertising, where as product related issues is predominately focuses on marketing of certain “harmful” products such as tobacco, unhealthy food, etc.

Excluding potential customers:

There are certain high-caution aspects of ethical marketing in terms of market audience, such as using selective marketing to discourage demand from an unwanted market group or exclude them altogether. An example of market exclusion or selective marketing could be a company not marketing towards gay, ethnic minority, or overweight (plus size) market groups. A company might do this if they do not expect these potential customers' spending to justify the cost of marketing targeted towards them.

It is often debated amongst the business community that in order to be profitable, often businesses have to be unethical. However, marketing towards specific groups that other companies ignore can also prove advantageous. In the United States, plus size apparel is thought to have generated $17.5 billion between May 2013 and April 2014, which is a 5% increase from the previous year; this is to be expected as 65% of American women are plus sized. Another example of exclusion from the market is some pharmaceutical industry's exclude developing countries from AIDS drugs.

=== Pricing ethics ===
Pricing ethics:

Pricing along with product, place and promotion are the four functions of marketing. Retailers and producers must ensure that ethical pricing strategies are performed in order to earn profits without deceiving competitors or consumers .Issues in pricing ethics are related to fairness, specifically the fair treatment of buyers and sellers as well as fair competition. Ethical pricing practice happens when it allows the market to remain competitive and other players in the market are treated fairly.

However buyers and sellers have different goals and perceived outcomes in the exchange process. Usually buyers are seeking to gain products and services at the best possible price whereas sellers are generally concentrated on generating maximum profit.

Price fixing:

Price fixing is maintaining a price at a certain level, which has been agreed upon between competing sellers and is illegal in most countries. When price fixing occurs and a price is set by an industry, customers are forced to pay the exorbitant price due to a lack of options.

Price fixing is considered unethical and socially irresponsible because it violates laws that are specifically designed to promote fair competition between companies. Competition encourages businesses to keep costs low and prices affordable in order to remain competitive.

Horizontal price-fixing occurs when competitors in a market who are selling the same product or service come to decide on a mutual price that they will both set for their products or services. The anti-trust law in the United States as well as the competition law of the European Union state that horizontal-price fixing agreements are illegal because it creates a monopolistic market environment that can exploit consumers.

Vertical price-fixing is also considered as illegal activity in the United States. This takes place when competitors in the same market enter into an agreement to set a mutual minimum or maximum resale price.

Price wars:

Price wars occur when businesses constantly lower their prices in an attempt to demoralize its competition . Price wars can create emotionally devastating and psychologically devastating situations, which has an extraordinary impact on an individual, a company and industry profits. The intention of a price war is to drive competitors out of the market or to create an entry barrier into the market. Although it is beneficial for consumers, as they will get the product or service at a low price, however they are often deprived for quality. Also in the long term, it will force other competitors out of business and lower profits threaten business survival.

If a company is involved in price war tactics, then it can be seen as unethical within the industry because they are starting a dangerous position and driving other companies to use similar tactics. A companies overall goal is to maximize its profits and revenue, however through engaging in a price war they are unable to do this and are more likely making less money as they would have had they taken part in normal business competition. If price wars can be avoided, it will prove to be vital success for any business.

Price collusion:

Price collusion occurs when several companies get together in order to hold the price of a good or service at a raised level in the hopes of achieving large profits or restricting the market. Price fixing is sometimes called price collusion in order to emphasize the agreement using secretive, to avoid fair competition.

Pricing practices that are considered unethical in most geographic markets include:

- Bid rigging
- Dumping (pricing policy)
- Predatory pricing
- Price gouging
- Price fixing
- Supra competitive pricing

List of pricing practices which may be unethical in certain circumstances and should be used with caution:

- Price discrimination (except where differential prices can be justified on economic grounds, such as discounts for volume purchasers)
- Price skimming
- Price war
- Variable pricing

=== Ethics in advertising and promotion ===
Advertising is a mass and paid form of communication, with the fundamental purpose of delivering information, shaping attitudes and inducing action beneficial to the advertiser – generally leading to the sale of a product or service. Advertising and promotion have a significant influence on people and society at large, shaping their attitudes, behaviors and priorities. Some scholars believe that advertising supports ethical issues. It is also considered unethical to shame a substitute or rivals' product or services (Srivastava & Nandan, 2010).

Other ethical issues include, mistreatment of women, advertising to children, misleading advertising and other issues, which lead to ethical decline of society. Mistreatment of women is evident immensely in advertisements. Often women are matched up with household products such as cleaning supplies and are shown as doing domestic work, which represents stereotyping of women. Women are also often used as sex symbols, to convey particular messages about products. Also men are often apparent in DIY (do it yourself) ads, which deliver the idea of them being a “handy man". An ad, which demonstrates ethical features, is truthful, it doesn’t make false claims, and it provides sufficient information for the buyer to make informed choices.

Exhibiting a level of respect and dignity for its buyers is important while demonstrating decency. An example of an advert produced by Coca Cola, through using false advertising, it showed unethical issues behind its production. Coca Cola used of Karl Langerfeld (Chanel designer) who had claimed to lose 80 pounds on a diet that was mainly attributed to diet coke, “I drink diet coke from the minute I get up to the minute I go to bed and I drink nothing else”. This advert was specially targeted towards women as it aimed to be conveyed as a fashion trend, through the use of a famous fashion designer. Coke used thin models and world-renowned fashion designers both of whom are cautious of body image, which shows the wrong message for women, especially young women. Often the line between ethical and unethical advertising is blurred, what may seem unethical to some consumers or businesses, may not to for others. Therefore, in cases like this, businesses should proceed with caution, because unethical advertising and promotion can fail, causing consumers to shy away from the company consequently defeating the purpose of any campaign.

Ethical pitfalls in advertising and promotional content include:

- Issues over truth and honesty. In the 1940s and 1950s, tobacco used to be advertised as promoting health. Today an advertiser who fails to tell the truth not only offends against morality but also against the law. However the law permits "puffery" (a legal term). The difference between mere puffery and fraud is a slippery slope: "The problem... is the slippery slope by which variations on puffery can descend fairly quickly to lies." See main article: false advertising.
- Issues with violence, sex and profanity. Sexual innuendo is a mainstay of advertising content (see sex in advertising), and yet is also regarded as a form of sexual harassment. Violence is an issue especially for children's advertising and advertising likely to be seen by children.
- Taste and controversy. The advertising of certain products may strongly offend some people while being in the interests of others. Examples include: feminine hygiene products, hemorrhoid and constipation medication. The advertising of condoms has become acceptable in the interests of AIDS-prevention, but are nevertheless seen by some as promoting promiscuity. Some companies have actually marketed themselves on the basis of controversial advertising - see Benetton. Sony has also frequently attracted criticism for unethical content (portrayals of Jesus which infuriated religious groups; racial innuendo in marketing black and white versions of its PSP product; graffiti adverts in major US cities).
- Negative advertising techniques, such as attack ads. In negative advertising, the advertiser highlights the disadvantages of competitor products rather than the advantages of their own. The methods are most familiar from the political sphere: see negative campaigning.
- Delivery channels
- Direct marketing is the most controversial of advertising channels, particularly when approaches are unsolicited. TV commercials and direct mail are common examples. Electronic spam and telemarketing push the borders of ethics and legality more strongly, and have been described as attention theft.
- Shills and astroturfers are examples of ways for delivering a marketing message under the guise of independent product reviews and endorsements, or creating supposedly independent watchdog or review organizations. For example, fake reviews can be published on Amazon. Shills are primarily for message-delivery, but they can also be used to drive up prices in auctions, such as eBay auctions.
- Native advertising is the blurring of lines between advertising and content.

==== Deceptive advertising ====
Another breach of marketing ethics has to do with the use of deceptive advertising. This form of advertising is not specific to one target market, and can sometimes go unnoticed by the public. There are a number of different ways in which deceptive marketing can be presented to consumers; one of these methods is accomplished through the use of humor. In a study conducted by Hassib Shabbir and Des Thwaites, 238 advertisements were assessed and 73.5% of them were found to have used deceptive marketing practices. Of those advertisements that were conducted deceptively, 74.5% of them used humor as a masking device in order to mislead potential customers. Part of what drives this study is the idea that humor provides an escape or relief from some kind of human constraint, and that some advertisers intend to take advantage of this by deceptively advertising a product that can potentially alleviate that constraint through humor. Through the study it was also found that all types of humor are used to deceive consumers, and that there are certain types of humor that are used when making certain deceptive claims.

It is important to understand that humor is not the only method that is used to deter consumer's minds from what a product actually offers. Before making important purchases, one should always conduct their own research in order to gain a better understanding of what it is they are investing in.

=== Ethics as marketing tactic ===
Business ethics has been an increasing concern among larger companies, at least since the 1990s. Major corporations increasingly fear the damage to their image associated with press revelations of unethical practices. Marketers have been among the fastest to perceive the market's preference for ethical companies, often moving faster to take advantage of this shift in consumer taste. This results in the expropriation of ethics itself as a selling point or a component of a corporate image.

- The Body Shop is an example of a company which marketed itself and its entire product range solely on an ethical message.
- Greenwashing is an example of a strategy used to make a company appear ethical when its unethical practices continue.
- Liberation marketing is another strategy whereby a product can masquerade behind an image that appeals to a range of values, including ethical values related to lifestyle and anti-consumerism.

"Liberation marketing takes the old mass culture critique — consumerism as conformity — fully into account, acknowledges it, addresses it, and solves it. Liberation marketing imagines consumers breaking free from the old enforcers of order, tearing loose from the shackles with which capitalism has bound us, escaping the routine of bureaucracy and hierarchy, getting in touch with our true selves, and finally, finding authenticity, that holiest of consumer grails." (Thomas Frank)

=== Marketing strategy ===
The main theoretical issue here is the debate between free markets and regulated markets. In a truly free market, any participant can make or change the rules. However, when new rules are invented which shift power too suddenly or too far, other participants may respond with accusations of unethical behaviour, rather than modifying their own behaviour to suit (which they might not be able to anyway). Most markets are not fully free: the real debate is as to the appropriate extent of regulation.

Case: California electricity crisis, which demonstrates how constant innovation of new marketing strategies by companies such as Enron outwitted the regulatory bodies and caused substantial harm to consumers and competitors.

A list of known unethical or controversial marketing strategies:

- Anti-competitive practices
- Bait and switch
- Planned obsolescence
- Pyramid scheme
- Vendor lock-in / Vendor lock-out
- Viral marketing / guerilla marketing
- Subliminal advertising

Controversial marketing strategies associated with the internet:

- Embrace, extend and extinguish
- Search engine optimisation
- Spamdexing
- Spyware / Adware

=== Further issues ===
Marketing ethics overlaps with environmental ethics in respect of waste problems associated with the packaging of products.

Some, such as members of the advocacy group No Free Lunch, have argued that marketing by pharmaceutical companies is negatively impacting physicians' prescribing practices, influencing them to prescribe the marketed drugs rather than others which may be cheaper or better for the patient.

Ethical thinking is responding to situations that deal with principles concerning human behavior in respect to the appropriateness and inappropriateness of certain communication and to the decency and indecency of the intention and results of such actions. In other words, ethics are distinctions between right and wrong. Businesses are confronted with ethical decision making every day, and whether employees decide to use ethics as a guiding force when conducting business is something that business leaders, such as managers, need to instill. Marketers are ethically responsible for what is marketed and the image that a product portrays. With that said, marketers need to understand what good ethics are and how to incorporate good ethics in various marketing campaigns to better reach a targeted audience and to gain trust from customers.

Marketing ethics, regardless of the product offered or the market targeted, sets the guidelines for which good marketing is practiced. When companies create high ethical standards upon which to approach marketing they are participating in ethical marketing. To market ethically and effectively one should be reminded that all marketing decisions and efforts are necessary to meet and suit the needs of customers, suppliers, and business partners. Ethical behavior should be enforced throughout company culture and through company practices.

However, marketers have been known to market questionable products to the public. These tend to be controversial products in that they appeal to some while offending others. An example of such a product that is sold regularly today is a cheap handgun. America is a country in which its citizens have the right to bear arms, yet these weapons are criticized by the public because they are sold at a low price making it rather easy to purchase by members of less affluent communities. Critics have referred to these weapons as " Saturday Night Specials" referring to the negative connotation that they are purchased to commit crimes. In defense of the critics opinions, if in fact these guns are purchased with the intent to commit such crimes, than one must question the ethics behind marketing these products to criminals. Is the marketer facilitating the crime by appealing to this target market with a weapon that is easily accessible? While the argument in this case may seem unethical due to the questionable nature of these cheap handguns, this argument does not apply to the sale of all guns. That is because weapons that are legally sold to customers at an affordable rate for safety purposes, self-defense, hunting, and law enforcement are perfectly ethical due to the fact that they are safe product that is marketed to a responsible consumer. This comparison supports the fact that ethical marketing can be perceived differently by consumers depending on the nature of the product that is being sold.

== Regulation and enforcement ==
Marketing ethics and marketing law are related subjects. Relevant areas of law include consumer law which protects consumers and antitrust law which protects competitors - in both cases, against unethical marketing practices. Regulation extends beyond the law to lobbies, watchdog bodies and self-regulatory industry bodies.

- Advertising regulation
- Consumer protection

== See also ==
- Consumerism
- Customer relationship management
- Ethical marketing
- False advertising
- Marketing
- Marketing warfare strategies
- Media ethics
- Propaganda
- Socially responsible marketing
- Stealth marketing

== Bibliography ==
- Davidson, D. Kirk (2002). The Moral Dimension of Marketing: Essays on Business Ethics. South-Western Educational. ISBN 978-0-87757-300-5.
- Murphy, Patrick E.; Gene R. Laczniak; Norman E. Bowie (2004). Ethical Marketing. Prentice Hall. ISBN 978-0-13-184814-6. OCLC 54805964.
- Kelly, B (2010). "Television Food Advertising to Children: A Global Perspective". American Journal of Public Health. 100 (9): 1730–1736. doi:10.2105/AJPH.2009.179267. PMC 2920955. PMID 20634464.
- "OPINION: Why advertising needs a wake-up call on ethics". Campaign Asia.
- CNBC. (2015, April 8). Retail's plus-size problem: Designing for larger sizes. Retrieved March 31, 2016, from http://www.cnbc.com/2015/04/08/retails-plus-size-problem-designing-for-larger-sizes.html
- Colley, R. (1961). Defining advertising goals for measured advertising results. New York .
- Ecchia, G.; Lambertini, L. (1997). "Minimum quality standards and collusion". The Journal of Industrial Economics. 45: 101–103. doi:10.1111/1467-6451.00037. hdl:10419/159078.
- Ellis, N., Fitchett, J., Higgins, M., Jack, G., Lim, M., Saren, M., et al. (2011). Marketing: A Critical Textbook. United Kingdom
- Gupta, S.; Pirsch, J. (2014). "Consumer Evaluation of Target Marketing to the Bottom of the Pyramid". Journal of International Consumer Marketing. 26: 58–74. doi:10.1080/08961530.2014.848084. S2CID 168105941.
- Harvard Business Review. (2000, March). How to Fight a Price War. Retrieved March 28, 2016, from https://hbr.org/2000/03/how-to-fight-a-price-war
- Klein, T. (2008). "Assessing Distributive Justice in Marketing: A Benefit-Cost Approach". Journal of Macromarketing. 28: 33–43. doi:10.1177/0276146707311243. S2CID 145206262.
- Mahmood, A., & Vulkan, N. (2013). How does dominance and competition affect the use of consumer information? Evidence from a famed field experiment. Retrieved from
- McDaniel, S. R.; Kinney, L.; Chalip, L. (2001). "A Cross-Cultural Investigation of the Ethical Dimensions of Alcohol and Tobacco Sports Sponsorships". Teaching Business Ethics. 5 (3): 307–330. doi:10.1023/A:1011428610136. S2CID 141786403.
- Melé, D. (2009). Business Ethics in Action: Seeking Human Excellence in Organizations. United Kingdom
- Nooh, M (2012). "ADVERTISING ETHICS: A REVIEW" (PDF). The Journal of Commerce: 33–44. Archived from the original (PDF) on 2020-11-25.
- Outterson, K. (2004). Pharmaceutical Arbitrage: balancing access and innovation in international prescription drug markets. Retrieved from http://www.who.int/intellectualproperty/news/en/Submission5.pdf
- Palmer, D.; Hedberg, T. (2012). "The Ethics of Marketing to Vulnerable Populations". Journal of Business Ethics: 403–413. doi:10.1007/570551-012-14762 (inactive 12 July 2025).
- Peppin, J. (1998). Price-Fixing Agreements under the Sherman AntiTrust Law. 299–303. Retrieved from http://scholarship.law.berkeley.edu/cgi/viewcontent.cgi?article=3704&context=californialawreview
- Srivastava, V., & Nandan, T. (2010). A Study of Perceptions in Society Regarding Unethical Practices in Advertising. South Asia Journal of Management, 61–69.
- Story, M., & French, S. (2004). Food Advertising and Marketing Directed at Children and Adolescents in the US. International Journal of Behavioral Nutrition and Physical Activity, 1–3. doi:10.1186/1479-5868-1-3
- The Guardian . (2013, January 12). How Diet Coke became fashion's favourite fizz. Retrieved April 1, 2016, from the guardian : http://www.theguardian.com/fashion/2013/jan/12/diet-coke-fashion-favourite-fizz
