= Ethical marketing =

Ethical marketing refers to the application of marketing ethics into the marketing process. Briefly, marketing ethics refers to the philosophical examination, from a moral standpoint, of particular marketing issues that are matters of moral judgment. Ethical marketing generally results in a more socially responsible and culturally sensitive business community.

The establishment of marketing ethics has the potential to benefit society as a whole, both in the short and long-term. As such, ethical marketing should be considered part of business ethics given that marketing forms a significant part of any business model. The study of ethical marketing falls under applied ethics and involves examining whether a product or service is represented honestly and factually within a broader framework of cultural and social values.

Ethical marketing emphasizes delivering qualitative benefits to its customers which other business practices, products or services fail to recognise. The concern with ethical issues such as child labor, poor working conditions, exploitative relationships with developing countries and environmental problems, has changed the attitude of the Western World to a more socially responsible way of thinking. As a result, ethical marketing has become a positive force, encouraging companies to promote their products in a more socially responsible way.

The increasing trend of fair trade is an example of the impact of ethical marketing. In the Ethical Shoppers Price Index Survey (2009), fair trade was the most popular ethical badge products could have. It also revealed that many consumers distrusted green claims. (The idea of fair trade is that consumers pay a guaranteed commodity price to a small group of producers, the producers agree to pay fair labor prices and conserve the environment - a fair deal for everyone.)

The philosophy of marketing is not lost with this newfound ethical slant, but rather hopes to win customer loyalty by reinforcing the positive values of the brand, thereby creating a strong, socially responsible brand identity. However, this shift in thinking does create new challenges for the marketer of the 21st century particularly in terms of invention and development of products that offer long-term benefits without reducing the product's desirable qualities.

Many brands have tried to use ethics to make themselves look responsible, often spinning environmental claims which has led to the term "greenwash". Research shows that consumers trust ethical claims in ads even less than standard advertising messages. Consequently, increased media scrutiny of ethical issues has resulted in many top brands suffering consumer boycotts. Although many brands have tried to capitalise on environmental issues, research shows that 2/3 of consumers responded more strongly to ethical claims that relate to people than those focused solely on the environment.

Ethical marketing should not be confused with government regulations designed to improve consumer welfare, such as reducing sulfur dioxide emissions to improve the quality of air. A government regulation is a legal remedy intended to mitigate or correct an ethical issue, such as air pollution. In contrast, enlightened ethical marketing occurs when the company and its marketers pursue further improvements for humankind, unrelated to those enforced by government or public opinion. For example, the Coop Group refuses to invest in tobacco, fur trade and countries with oppressive regimes.

Over the past few years ethical marketing has become a more important part of marketing with many universities adding modules on the importance of ethics within the industry, trade bodies such as the ICC have also added their own courses.

Many industry awards also recognize the importance of ethical marketing in the mix.

== See also ==
- Business ethics
- Fair trade
- Greenwashing
- Marketing ethics
- Socially responsible marketing
