= Democratized transactional giving =

Form of corporate philanthropy

Democratized transactional giving is a form of corporate philanthropy and the latest evolution in cause marketing, (defined as when for-profit companies join forces with nonprofits to promote a cause) where consumers, and not the brand in question, have maximum control over the causes they choose to support. Augmenting traditional corporate philanthropy and participatory cause marketing, democratized transactional giving empowers consumers to become better brand and cause advocates while promoting a strong behavioral influence that seeks to yield greater loyalty and brand commitment.

Successful democratized transactional giving is the outgrowth or result of a fully realized cause-related loyalty marketing campaign which not only links nonprofits and for-profits together, but does so in the context of an existing company's loyalty program. The result is that consumers can convert any unused rewards issued by the company in the form of points, miles or other units to causes and nonprofits of their own choosing.

== Difference from traditional corporate philanthropy ==
According to KULA Causes, Inc., of Boulder, Colorado, which in 2010 designed and launched the Cause-Related Loyalty Marketing (CLM) software solution for companies looking to improve their loyalty and philanthropic efforts, corporate philanthropy/cause marketing has evolved in three phases.

Phase one was an autocratic approach where the brand selected the cause in question, the brand told the “cause story,” and the result was low customer behavioral influence. Phase two witnessed the growth of participatory cause marketing. Under this improvement, the brand still selects a number of causes (and tells the cause story) while customers choose causes from among that limited selection. The result is growing customer behavioral influence. In democratized transactional giving decisions and brand advocacy responsibility has been passed on to the consumer – a level of control that inspires a strong behavioral influence.

== Benefits for companies ==
When companies allow customers to donate unused rewards to causes of the customer's choosing, the customer develops a greater appreciation for the company. Edelman PR found in its 2012 Goodpurpose Study that "72% of consumers would recommend a brand that supports a good cause over one that doesn’t, a 39% increase since 2008." By facilitating democratized transactional giving, companies can see that benefit as deepened customer loyalty.

== Benefits for consumers ==
Humans’ hard-wired capacity for empathy fuels the desire to help those in need, because people can imagine themselves in the same situation. Consumers who act on this impulse benefit from the positive feelings associated with spending money on a good cause.

== Benefits for nonprofits ==
Nonprofits as a whole benefit when consumers rather than companies dictate where donations, including donations of unredeemed loyalty-program rewards, will go. This is because increasing numbers of consumers participating in democratized transactional giving also mean a wider diversity of nonprofits being helped according to each individual consumer's cause affinities – the types of causes they tend to support.

== See also ==
- Alternative giving
