= Societal marketing =

Marketing concept

Societal responsibility of marketing is a marketing concept that holds that a company should make marketing decisions not only by considering consumers' wants, the company's requirements, but also society's long-term interests.

The societal marketing concept holds that an organisation should provide products for consumers while building revenue using profit and at the same time, also benefitting the society by producing sustainable and benefitting-to-the-society products. Therefore, marketers must endeavor to satisfy the needs and wants of their target markets in ways that preserve and enhance the well-being of consumers and society as a whole. It is closely linked with the principles of corporate social responsibility and of sustainable development.

== Definition ==
Societal marketing can be defined as a "marketing with a social dimension or marketing that includes non-economic criteria". Societal marketing "concerns for society's long term interests". It is about "the direct benefits for the organization and secondary benefit for the community". Societal marketing distinguishes between the consumer's immediate satisfaction and longer term consumer and social benefits. Accordingly, Andreas Kaplan defines societal management as "management that takes into account society's overall welfare in addition to mere profitability considerations." It is a 3 dimensional concept of marketing – social welfare, individual welfare, organization profit

== Objectives ==
Various attempts to define the objectives of societal marketing have been noted, such as:

- "Social responsibility implies that a business decision maker. is obliged to take actions that also protect and enhance society's interests.
- "Business has the responsibility to help [the consumer] .It is the duty of business to promote proper consumption values."
- "Business leaders are not mandated to adopt roles of leadership

in  the advancement of our society to new levels of moral conduct."They may help in mutual understanding of the reasons

== History ==
The concept of societal marketing emerged in the early 1970s, promoting a more socially responsible, moral and ethical model of marketing in an effort to counter some of the more serious criticisms of marketing that had arisen out of the consumerist movement around that time.

Philip Kotler is generally credited with introducing the societal marketing concept to the literature in a 1972 article "What Consumerism Means for Marketers" in the Harvard Business Review of 1972. Certainly Kotler believed that he had coined the term, "societal marketing" and was the first to codify it within the marketing literature. Some marketing historians, notably Wilkie and Moore, have argued that a societal perspective was not new, and that evidence for it could be found in marketing theory and in marketing texts, since the discipline's inception in the early 1900s. Kotler introduced both the concept of social marketing (extending marketing technologies into non-business areas) and societal marketing, arguing that the marketing concept and its technologies must be tempered and ultimately revised by adopting a more explicit social orientation. The novelty of Kotler's concept was the idea of "long-run consumer welfare", emphasizing that the short-term desires might not support the consumer's long term interests or be good for the society as a whole.

The societal marketing concept adopts the position that marketers have a greater social responsibility than simply satisfying customers and providing them with superior value. Instead, marketing activities should strive to benefit society's overall well-being. Marketing organisations that have embraced the societal marketing concept typically identify key stakeholder groups including: employees, customers, local communities, the wider public and government and consider the impact of their activities on all stakeholders. They ensure that marketing activities do not damage the environment and are not hazardous to broader society. Societal marketing developed into sustainable marketing. Societal marketing requires businesses to include social, ethical and ecological considerations in product and market planning.

== Instruments ==
Kotler identified four categories of products, classified in terms of long term benefits and immediate satisfaction:

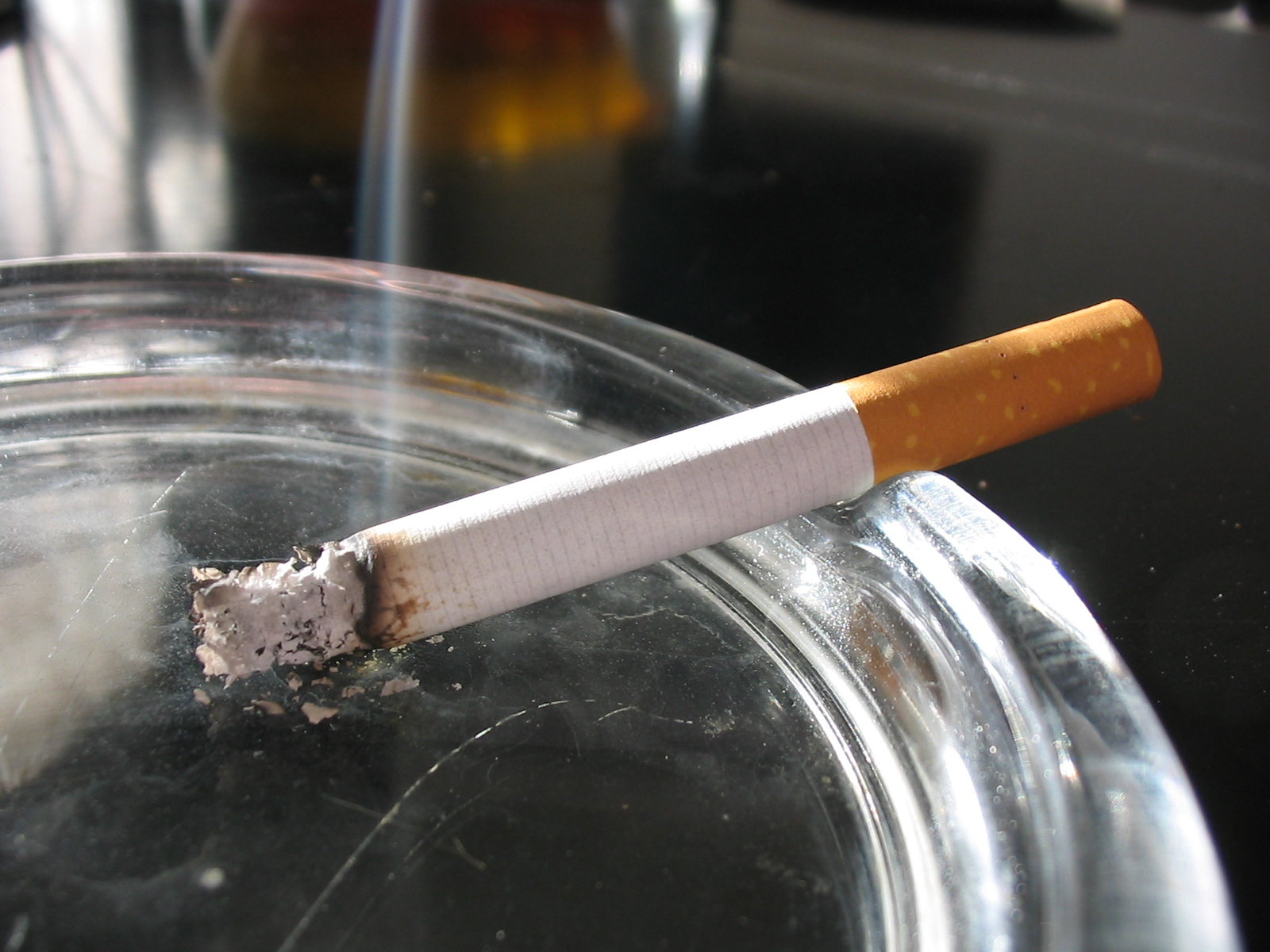
Cigarettes are typically classified as a pleasing products since they deliver immediate benefits with long-term social harm

1. Deficient products, which bring neither long-run or short term benefits
2. Pleasing products, which bring a high level of immediate satisfaction, but can cause harm to the society in the long run
3. Salutary products, which bring low short term satisfaction, but benefit the society in the long run
4. Desirable products, which combine long-run benefit and immediate satisfaction

Kotler's concept of societal marketing suggested that for the well-being of society, deficient products should be eliminated from the market, pleasing and salutary products should go through a product modification process to acquire desirable status, by incorporating missing short term benefits into salutary products and long term benefits into pleasing products, and the companies' ultimate goal should be to develop desirable products. Rather than focusing on selling products, which can be good or bad for the consumers, companies should focus on consumer and society's well-being.

== Examples ==
Most companies recognize that socially responsible activities improve their image among customers, stockholders, the financial community, and other relevant publics. Ethical and socially responsible practices are simply good business, resulting not only in favorable image, but ultimately in increased sales.

- The Body Shop: The Body Shop International plc is the original, natural and ethical beauty brand. The company uses only plant-based materials for its products. It is against Animal testing, supports community trade, activate Self Esteem, Defend Human Rights, and overall protection of the planet. They have also their own charity, The Body Shop Foundation, to assist those working to achieve progress in the areas of human and civil rights, environmental and animal protection. Thus Body shop is really following the concept of Societal Marketing.
- AVON Product inc. has started an initiative known as Avon breast cancer awareness crusade in 1993 in partnership with National Alliance of breast cancer Foundation (NABCO).They started selling pink ribbon pins which depicts the international symbol for breast cancer for$2 and donates $1 to NABCO. Through the crusade, Avon sales representatives have raised billion of dollars for breast cancer education and access to early detection services for underserved women. In addition, Avon's 45,000 US salespeople have been trained to discuss breast cancer and the importance of early detection with their customers and distributed 80 million flyers on breast cancer detection.
- Coca-Cola: Coca-Cola is an American multi-national carbonated beverage. The company manufactures and retails of nonalcoholic beverage concentrates and syrups. It also produces soft drinks such as Tab, Fanta, and sprite. Fanta was originally an orange-based soft drink in bottle and can. In 2004, it published the song 'America is Beautiful' in different languages. It shows cultural harmony from a large point of view.

== Societal marketing v social marketing ==
Societal marketing should not be confused with social marketing. Societal marketing is a philosophy or mindset that informs marketing decisions whereas social marketing is a distinct branch within the marketing discipline. Societal marketing is concerned with the consideration of the social and ethical aspects of marketing planning. Social marketing is concerned with facilitating social change. A key difference is that the greater 'social good' is the principal consideration in social marketing while social benefits are one of a number of considerations in societal marketing.

On the other hand, social marketing is a sub-branch of marketing that began in 1971, with the publication of an article by Kotler and Zaltman, emphasising a planned approach to achieving social change. It is primarily concerned with encouraging pro-social behaviours (e.g. recycling, sun-safety, safe driving practices) and discouraging anti-social behaviours (e.g. littering, drink-driving). It is defined as an "adaptation of commercial marketing technologies to programs designed to influence the voluntary behavior of target audiences to improve their personal welfare and that of the society of which they are a part".

Social marketing uses more traditional commercial techniques and strategies, focusing on persuasion, to achieve goals for the greater social good. Its campaigns can either encourage merit goods, as for example fundraising for not-for-profit organizations or dissuade the use of demerit goods promoting society's well-being, as non-smoking campaigns or promote the use of seat belts. Another characteristic of social marketing is that is planned to influence individual behaviour to improve well-being. It includes more than just advertising in traditional mass media, and may extend to educational programs and formal enforcement regimes in the case of road safety campaigns. It planned campaigns, implemented by governmental and non-governmental organisations. A clear example that differentiates societal from social marketing is a marketing campaign on non-smoking. A smoking cessation advertisement is an example of social marketing, but if the marketing strategies and techniques used in that campaign focus on increasing the well-being of society, that same campaign can be an example of societal marketing.

The societal marketing concept was a forerunner of sustainable marketing in integrating issues of social responsibility into commercial marketing strategies. In contrast to that, social marketing uses commercial marketing theories, tools and techniques to influence social change. Social marketing applies a "customer orientated" approach and uses the concepts and tools used by commercial marketers in pursuit of social goals like Anti-Smoking-Campaigns or fundraising for NGOs.

== Corporate social responsibility (CSR) ==
Unlike societal marketing, CSR has existed for many years. Another difference is that CSR "focuses more in a corporate level and stakeholders", while societal marketing is more concerned about the consumer and their long term benefits. CSR social and environmental concerns are integrated into all business operations. CSR is mainly run by companies, while social marketing mainly by government or non-profit organizations. One example of CSR among companies is what Häagen-Dazs is doing with their "microsite" to raise awareness to the general public about the preservation of the honeybee.

== Branding ==
Corporations strive for improvement, and often turn to corporate societal marketing programs to help build and repair their brand images.

Corporate social marketing (CSM), usually refers to marketing efforts that have at least one social related objective, such as charity founding, among its goals. Typical examples are releasing a certain percentage of the final sale product to a charity related to the product, or sponsoring events that encourage social well-being such as the Olympic Games. Corporate Social Marketing benefits a company in many ways, but its main goal is to improve the image the public has of the company. A company that appears committed to improving the lives of others, the environment or other worthy causes is seen in a better light than one who doesn't, and more and more business are hoping to benefit from that.

So, it can be so, that CSM programs are becoming extremely popular because the leaders believe that it is a good business to be viewed as a socially responsible company. However, even though past research suggests that CSM may be effective in improving brand equity and increasing market share, there are limits to the effectiveness of these initiatives.

An example of his is how corporate social initiatives adversely affected purchase intentions if consumers perceived that the company would forgo product quality in order to be socially responsible.

Depending on the nature of the CSM program, the intent of the corporation may not be as obvious to the consumers. This happens if the benefits to the corporation are not apparent or conflicts with what the consumer already believes about a specific firm or industry.

Since firms exist to make a profit, consumers may spend considerable energy in an attempt to infer motives related to the profit-oriented goals. As an example, a consumer may be suspicious of a tobacco company that undertakes a campaign to prevent underage smoking. If this is successful, the company would be affected and the cigarette sales will be lowered. So, in this situation, consumers' suspicions may lead them to infer motives that would actually protect the companies financial condition – as they are trying to improve their image to sell more cigarettes to adults. However, if a tobacco company undertook a CSM Campaign, that would sustain their business, consumers may be able to infer profit motives more easily and then have a more favorable attitude toward the partnership. Therefore, it can be concluded that the attitude of the consumers could be better if they knew more about the motives of the companies and they were more obvious.

Another aspect that may cause suspicion with consumers is the amount of harm that a company has already done, either because of unsafe products or harmful production practices. It is logical that consumers are more suspicious to companies that sell harmful products. Again examples are the tobacco companies and alcohol companies as well. They will meet resistance from consumers when they undertake socially-oriented campaigns aimed at mitigating the effects of their products. That is why when different industries are separated, two very general dimensions are used – the harmful nature of the products and the harmful nature of the production methods.

This classification can briefly show how consumers are influenced by the various CSM efforts. Companies that work in this "dangerous" industries are not that successful always, because the consumers may be suspicious of any societal efforts the company attempts to undertake. Consumers will infer less society-serving motives and more self-serving motives for corporate societal marketing programs undertaken by firms that operate in mixed or sin industries.

Based on how easily consumers could infer profit-driven motives, are classified the types of CSM campaigns: Positively tied to product sales, positively tied to product sales, not directly tied to sales but aimed at sustaining the company's business, completely unrelated.

== Criticisms ==
Societal marketing has been the subject of a number of criticisms:

A key issue concerns the question of who decides what is in the public's best interests. The moral agenda implicit in the societal marketing concept is underdeveloped and often implicit. Gaski argued that marketers should step away from their classic goal of customer satisfaction and profit maximization while respecting the minimum governmental standards imposed by law and enter this public policy area, since marketers themselves would have to decide what actions are consistent with public welfare. Marketers might have neither the competence nor the right to determine the "public interest." Instead, it should be the customers who decide what is good for them, or their political representatives and dictate that to the industry.

Some scholars have argued that societal marketing is not a distinct concept, but rather it is a mere extension of the marketing concept. Others have pointed out that the literature in the field is vague, poorly defined and underdeveloped. The societal marketing concept has become an excellent strategy for promotions with social dimensions and for exploring consumers' behavioural response to such corporate 'doing good'.

Future development of the concept

Societal marketing is gaining the marketers and consumer attention and there is every reason to expect it to continue to evolve in practice. It focuses on providing win-win opportunities to companies, consumers and society. But achieving the compelling benefits for each party involved is very complicated. So much more research is needed. To achieve a win situation for organization involved, is dependent largely upon how the key constituents react. In this context, anticipating consumer reaction is really challenging which can be affected by number of factors that often vary across different segments. The several research questions remain to be answered like how different factors affects reaction to societal marketing and how do the various factors interact? How can societal initiatives be designed to leverage positive reaction and mitigate negative ones?

For consumers to win, societal marketing must provide them with compelling benefits that increase their overall welfare. What benefits did societal marketing initiative actually provided to consumers? Are there direct benefits such as increased satisfaction with their interaction with commercial or nonprofit organization? Determining whether there is a win situation for society by societal marketing initiative is the most difficult question to be answered. We turn to the two questions proposed by Bloom, Hussien and Szykmann (1995): Is the society better off because of this program? Does corporate involvement result in better performance than if it would have been managed by NGOs or government agencies? Societal marketing is becoming globally popular but there exists a scarcity of research in this field. Therefore, extensive future research is needed particularly investigating questions with respect to its impact on consumer attitudes to corporate image, product image and their purchase intention or brand choice as well as on positive impact on society.

== See also ==
- Sustainability marketing
- Social marketing
- Green marketing
