= Socially responsible marketing =

Marketing philosophy

Socially responsible marketing is a marketing philosophy that encourages companies to consider the long-term interests of society when developing and implementing marketing strategies. The concept is closely tied to sustainable marketing that focuses on creating and delivering value to consumers while also preserving natural and human resources. Scholars note that sustainability marketing has evolved to address environmental, social, and ethical concerns through marketing practices. Socially responsible marketing is critical of excessive consumerism and environmental damages caused by corporations. It is based on the idea that market offerings must not be only profit-driven, but they must also reinforce social and ethical values for the benefit of citizens.

== Overview ==
The idea of socially responsible marketing is sometimes viewed as an extension of the concept of Corporate Social Responsibility (CSR). CSR is promoted as a business model to help companies self-regulate, recognizing that their activities impact an assortment of stakeholders, including the general public. CSR is sometimes described in terms of a pyramid, starting with economic as its base, then legal, ethical and philanthropic actions at the top. It is in the last two layers of the CSR pyramid, ethical and philanthropic, that socially responsible marketing opportunities appear the greatest. Meeting the first two layers, economic and legal, are necessary for a business to thrive in order to engage in the later two.

=== Ethics ===
Social responsibility in marketing is often discussed with a focus on ethics. According to Jung and Kim (2023), stakeholder theory holds that firms should consider the interests of all stakeholders, including customers, employees, investors, society, and government. Within this framework, companies are expected to be transparent while pursuing profit. This approach positions ethical principles as central to marketing practices, particularly in addressing the needs and concerns of the consumers, including environmentally conscious or “green” consumers. Ethical marketing principles have also been associated with increased credibility and consumer trust.

Scholars have also distinguished between ethics and social responsibility in marketing. What is considered ethical may vary across business, societal, and individual perspectives, and not all ethical business practices are necessarily socially responsible. Some interpretations of socially responsible suggest that it involves not only keeping the established ethical standards but also exceeding them.

Regulatory bodies have also addressed the ethical dimensions of marketing. For instance, The Advertising Standards Authority in the UK has laid down rules which requires all marketing communication to be socially responsible.(Updated citation information needed) Content that is deemed irresponsible or that promotes harmful behavior may be subject to review. Areas of concern include the portrayal of alcohol, violence, body image, objectification, drugs, and tobacco fall under the socially irresponsible category when used inappropriately by the marketer.

=== As a response to mainstream marketing ===
Socially responsible marketing has been described as a response to concerns from conventional marketing. Scholars have identified several criticisms of traditional marketing systems, particularly in relation to economic and societal effects. One area of criticism concern pricing structures. Mainstream marketing strategies generally lead to high prices.

Another commonly discussed issue is product differentiation. While differentiation is a widely used marketing strategy, critics argue that it may create perceived value differences that are not always based on substantive product distinctions. This has also been linked to environmental concerns, particularly in relation to packaging and resource use. In this context, socially responsible marketing is often presented as an approach that seeks to avoid misleading or deceptive practices in pricing, promotion, and packaging, including those that may be legally permissible.

Beyond economic considerations, marketing also has an impact on the values of the society. The advocates of socially responsible marketing argue that the current system can encourage people to buy more than they actually need, inject constant desire for material possession, and lead to excessive spending. This perspective suggests that such practices may promote materialism and increased consumer spending, with potential negative consequences for societal well-being. Thus, socially responsible marketing draws attention to the "social costs" that are embedded in the marketing, selling and consumption of private commodities. It calls for a marketing system that contributes to social and environmental sustainability, while producing profits for businesses.

== Historical Background ==
Sustainability marketing has evolved step by step. The evolution of this field has a history, witnessing multiple stages such as ecological, environmental and sustainable.

=== Ecological Marketing (late 1960s–1970s) ===
Ecological Marketing refers to an early phase in the development of environmentally oriented marketing thought, emerging in the late 1960s and continuing through the 1970s. During this period, ecological marketing primarily focused on addressing urgent environmental issues of the time, including air pollution, the adverse ecological effects of chemicals and pesticides, and concerns over declining oil reserves.

This stage was especially influenced by the publication of Silent Spring by Rachel Carson in 1962. The book highlighted the harmful environmental impacts of chemical substances, particularly pesticides, and is widely credited with contributing to the rise of modern environmental consciousness. The raised public concern resulted in the creation of some regulatory laws in the US, such as the U.S. Environmental Protection Agency (1970). This then also resulted in another interesting phenomenon: the researchers in the marketing field began to study environmentally concerned consumer behavior. Key events include the American Marketing Association workshop (1975) and their study on the practice of repairing long-lasting products instead of replacing them.

=== Environmental/Green Marketing (1980s–1990s) ===
Starting from the 1980s Environmental or Green Marketing emerged until the 1990s. The focus of green marketing was satisfying the environmentally conscious consumers. Academic studies observed that there was a rapid increase in green consumers (same as environmentally conscious consumers) and this received its response from the business sector. During this time businesses paid more attention to meet the needs and requirements of their consumers and hence green marketing became a competitive advantage for them. The broader influence of all this is the spread of green marketing across different industries, not just one field of business, unlike the earlier ecological marketing period.

=== Sustainable Marketing (2000s onward) ===
The development of the sustainable marketing period started from the 2000s and still continues. In contrast to the previous period, where sustainable marketing in the business was considered an advantage, this period aimed at full integration of sustainable practices into the business and consideration of such costs as well. However, market limitations were also acknowledged, specifically the fact that traditional marketing does not fully address the social and environmental problems. For this, multiple practices were encouraged; specifically: focus on long-term sustainable value, insitituational and system level change as well as macro-marketing perspective.

1. Focus on long-term sustainable value - this practice prioritized creating long-term and valuable relationships with the business consumers and customers.
2. Institutional and system-level change - this practice encourages businesses to make it a must to achieve the sustainable development goals in their business activities.
3. Macro-marketing perspective - this practice suggests collaboration between the business and the government. Such a collaboration should address important global issues such as air pollution, climate change, socioeconomic inequality, resource scarcity, etc.

== Types ==
There are several related marketing concepts that fall under the umbrella of socially responsible marketing, these include: social marketing, cause-related marketing, environmental or green marketing, "enviropreneurial" marketing, quality of life, and socially responsible buying.

=== Enlightened marketing ===
The philosophy of enlightened marketing is a concept that falls under the umbrella of socially responsible marketing. Enlightened marketing states that "a company's marketing should support the best long-run performance of the marketing system. This concept contains the five principles: consumer-oriented marketing, innovative marketing, value marketing, sense-of-mission marketing and societal marketing.

=== Consumer-oriented Marketing ===
In consumer-oriented marketing, the company "organizes its marketing activities from the consumer's point of view." Marketing activities focus on the needs of a defined user set.

=== Innovative Marketing ===
Innovative marketing states that a company must continue to improve its products and marketing efforts, recognizing that if it does not, it risks losing business to a competitor that does.

=== Value Marketing ===
The principle of value marketing contends that a company "should put most of its resources into value-building marketing investments." One criticism of marketing its short term focus in the sense of promotions and minor improvements. Value marketing seeks to create long term customer loyalty by adding significant value to the consumer offer.

=== Sense-of-mission marketing ===
Sense-of-mission marketing suggests a company mission be defined in "broad social terms" as opposed to "narrow product terms." This technique frames the business goal in a way that the organization can rally behind a deeper sense of purpose. Millennials have become cautious of their brand choices as they are getting affected by socially responsible marketing. They prefer associating with brands that are honest, environmentally conscious, ethical, and working towards the betterment of the society. The rise of TOMS to a $400 million company is a case in point.

The principle of societal marketing asks company's to consider the "consumers' wants and long-run interests, the company's requirements and society's long-run interests."

== Green marketing ==
The term green marketing refers to the marketing of products and services that are designed to minimize environmental harm, as well as broader efforts to reduce the negative environmental impact of production and consumption. The interest in green marketing has grown significantly over time. Academic research in this field has expanded, with a growing number of publications and literature reviews examining its development. For example, some studies report that citations in the fields related to green marketing have increased by 200% from 2011 to 2021. The mention of such statistics from the scientists also leads them to think that the public interest in green marketing has helped the growth of the significance of the field. Research output has been concentrated in countries such as the United States, India, and China, which are among the leading contributors to the field.

Research also has concluded that the practice of green marketing is not only helpful to the environment but also gives trustworthiness to the businesses practicing it. It grows the customer satisfaction and hence brings more sales. This increasing sustainable requirements from the consumer’s side as well as studies on this field had their effects on the scope of green marketing. This practice is commonly associated alongside the terms: green products, greenwashing, corporate social responsibility, digital marketing, and green economy.

But the explorations in this field and the rising interest in it does not yet mean that the issues are solved in green marketing. According to Bhadwaj et al, the countries, the governments and the businesses still have lots of work to do in order to achieve a proper level of awareness about this phenomenon. The research done by different scholars from different countries can help the managers to integrate in their practice green marketing strategies that minimize the customers’ price sensitivity. Another way to promote green marketing is education. Policymakers should consider creating ways to educate children and help them to know more about the human-nature connection, which then will affect their understanding of sustainability, green marketing and the importance of it.

== Benefits to business ==
The practice of socially responsible marketing has many distinct advantages for businesses who choose to embrace it.

In terms of financial advantages, the government has established a number of tax-cuts and other benefits for companies in many industries as incentives to be more socially responsible. For instance, companies that reduce their carbon emissions and pollution levels are often offered tax exemptions and other assets for their cooperation in the country's movement towards environmental awareness and responsibility.

Even in cases where pre-determined benefits like this are not available as incentives, it is still in a company's best interest in the long run to move towards more socially responsible methods. By dealing proactively with potentially harmful or socially detrimental marketing methods and deciding to promote the public well-being with their products, a company can effectively eliminate the need for legislative and regulative obstacles in the future. In other words, by making a concerted effort to be socially responsible in the first place, a company provides less of a reason for the government to develop any taxes or extra restrictions on their business in the first place, which helps them in the long run. Similarly, social responsibility in marketing helps to ensure that a company is, in fact, following the rules and this not only instills faith among the customer base, but also helps to keep the company out of any kind of trouble in terms of legal problems and also in terms of public relations.

Customers also appreciate social responsibility and as a result, companies can gain business and maintain it with more ease. For example, if a company can certify their product as "green," they gain a certain degree of competitive advantage over competition and many customers will be more willing to buy their product than one that has not been certified as "green," because they perceive the value of the product to be higher than others. Further, these types of things can instill a sense of faith and goodwill in customers and cause the consumers not only to feel better about buying the product in the first place, but also feel better about buying it again. Socially responsible marketing makes sense as a business strategy because it not only broadens and expands the customer base, but increases the likelihood of developing customer loyalty and getting them to buy their product again in the future.

Research on the relationship between socially responsible marketing and business performance has also been conducted in academic settings. For example, a longitudinal study has been done by the faculty members in the Department of Management Studies (DMS) at the National Institute of Technology, Durgapur, India. It explored whether this kind of marketing helps the growth of the business or not. According to this study, some forms of traditional marketing were found to be less effective over time, which the authors attributed to changing consumer attitudes toward advertising. The research also states that one of the ways to practice socially responsible marketing is by donating to charitable or social causes (such as donating to educational programs, healthcare, environmental causes, etc), which demonstrated that it had a consistent positive effect on business profit, compared to traditional marketing.

== Diversity, Equity, and Inclusion (DEI) in SRM ==
Socially responsible marketing not only grows the business profits but also promotes diversity, equity and inclusion (DEI) within organizations This kind of marketing is another tool for challenging stereotypes and striving towards more inclusiveness.

SRM promotes DEI through three main ways: inclusive marketing, cause-related marketing and ethical advertising.

Inclusive advertising says that the businesses should include more diverse groups, ethnicities, genders, etc. For example, the inclusion of diverse models and narratives increased the brand awareness and perception towards its customers. Cause-related marketing is a way to mobilize consumer support is by partnering with organizations that actively promote and stand for social justice and are against inequality. According to the research, ethical advertising is an essential part of SRM too, since its priority is advertising and raising awareness about the products in the most transparent and honest way avoiding deception and black PR. This is about trust between the service provider and its consumer, about building that credibility and authenticity.

Consumers may have increased trust and prefer brands that promote inclusiveness, equity and are responsible for their advertising. This can boost long-term profitability for the business, brand reputation and customer loyalty.
