= Merit good =

Good that people should have solely for its benefit

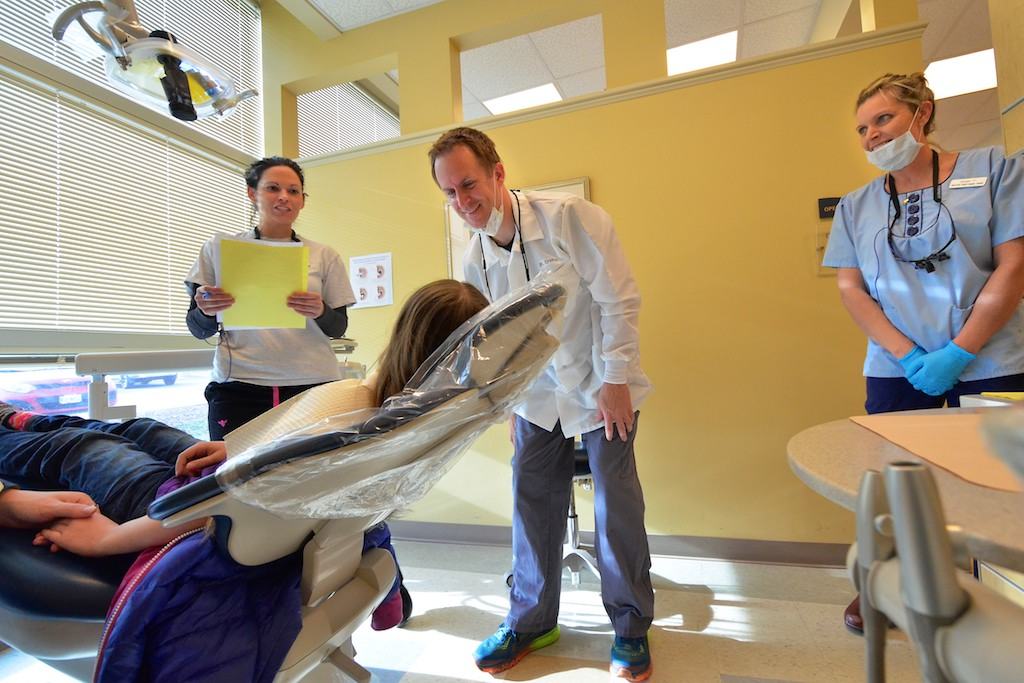
The Lloyd Moss Free Clinic in Fredericksburg, Virginia, offers free dental care to children.

The economic concept of a merit good (or worthy good), originated by Richard Musgrave (1957, 1959), is a commodity or service that it is judged an individual or society should have on the basis of some concept of benefit, rather than ability and willingness to pay. The term is, perhaps, less often used in the 2020s than it was during the 1960s to 1980s, but the concept still motivates many economic actions by governments. Essentially, these are private goods that are subject to collective consumption.

Examples of merit goods include in-kind transfers to people such as the provision of food stamps to assist nutrition, the delivery of healthcare services to improve quality of life and reduce morbidity, and subsidized housing and education.

The opposite of a merit good is a demerit good, "a good or service whose consumption is considered unhealthy, degrading, or otherwise socially undesirable due to the perceived negative effects on the consumers themselves" (e.g., tobacco, alcoholic beverages, recreational drugs, gambling and junk food).

== Definition ==
A merit good can be defined as a good which would be under-consumed (and under-produced) by a free market economy, for two main reasons:

1. When consumed, a merit good creates positive externalities (an externality being a third party/spill-over effect of the consumption or production of the good/service). This means that there is a divergence between private benefit and public benefit when a merit good is consumed (i.e. the public benefit is greater than the private benefit). However, as consumers only take into account private benefits when consuming most goods, it means that they are under-consumed (and so under-produced).
2. Individuals are short-term utility maximisers and so do not take into account the long term benefits of consuming a merit good, so they are under-consumed.

== Justification ==
In many cases, merit goods are services which proponents believe should be made available universally to everyone in a particular situation, an opinion that is similar to that of the concept of primary goods found in work by philosopher John Rawls or discussions about social inclusion. Lester Thurow claims that merit goods (and in-kind transfers) are justified based on "individual-societal preferences": just as we, as a society, permit each adult citizen an equal vote in elections, we should also entitle each person an equal right to life, and hence an equal right to life-saving medical care.

On the supply side, it is sometimes suggested that there will be more endorsement in society for implicit redistribution via the provision of certain kinds of goods and services, rather than explicit redistribution through income.

It is sometimes suggested that society in general may be in a better position to determine what individuals need, since individuals might act in a fashion which is deemed not to be in their own interest by others (for example, using welfare payments to buy alcohol instead of nutritious food).

Sometimes, merit and demerit goods (goods which are considered to affect the consumer negatively, but not society in general) are simply considered as an extension of the idea of externalities. A merit good may be described as a good that has positive externalities associated with it. Thus, an inoculation against a contagious disease may be considered as a merit good, because others who may not catch the disease from the inoculated person also benefit.

However, merit and demerit goods can be defined in a different manner without reference to externalities. Consumers can be considered to under-consume merit goods (and over-consume demerit goods) due to an information failure. This happens because most consumers do not perceive quite how good or bad the good is for them: either they do not have the right information or lack relevant information. With this definition, a merit good is defined as a good that is better for a person than the person who may consume the good realises.

Other possible rationales for treating some commodities as merit (or demerit) goods include public-goods aspects of a commodity, imposing community standards (prostitution, drugs, etc.), immaturity or incapacity, and addiction. A common element of all of these is recommending for or against some goods on a basis other than consumer choice. For the case of education, it can be argued that those lacking education are incapable of making an informed choice about the benefits of education, which would warrant compulsion (Musgrave, 1959, 14). In this case, the implementation of consumer sovereignty is the motivation, rather than rejection of consumer sovereignty.

Public Choice Theory suggests that good government policies are an under-supplied merit good in a democracy.

== Criticism ==
Arguments about the irrational behavior of welfare receivers are often criticised for being paternalistic, often by those who would like to reduce to a minimum economic activity by government.

The principle of consumer sovereignty in welfare also suggests that monetary transfers are preferable to in-kind transfers of the same cost.
