= Cause marketing =

Form of corporate marketing

Cause marketing is marketing done by a for-profit business that seeks to both increase profits and to better society in accordance with corporate social responsibility, such as by including activist messages in advertising.

A similar phrase, cause-related marketing, usually refers to a subset of cause marketing that involves the cooperative efforts of a for-profit business and a non-profit organization for mutual benefit. A high-profile form of cause-related marketing occurs at checkout counters when customers are asked to support a cause with a charitable donation. Cause marketing differs from corporate giving (philanthropy), as the latter generally involves a specific donation that is tax-deductible, while cause marketing is a promotional campaign not necessarily based on a donation.

== History ==
The United States Congress passed the Endangered Species Act on December 14, 1973. In response, 7-Eleven sold Endangered Species Cups, and donated one cent from the sale of each cup to the National Wildlife Federation. Donations from the program totaled $250,000, which the National Wildlife Federation used to purchase Bald Eagle habitat. The transfer of land to the U.S. Government and U.S. Fish and Wildlife Service took place on December 19, 1974, and came to be known as the Karl E. Mundt National Wildlife Refuge.

In 1976, a cause marketing campaign was executed by means of a partnership between the Marriott Corporation and the March of Dimes. Marriott's objective was to generate cost-effective public relations and media coverage for the opening of their 200-acre (0.81 km^{2}) family entertainment center, Marriott's Great America in Santa Clara, California. The March of Dimes's objective was to increase fundraising while motivating the collection of pledges by the program's deadline. The promotion was conducted simultaneously in 67 cities throughout the western United States. This cause marketing campaign and partnership raised an unprecedented $2.4 million, to become the most successful promotion in the history of Chapters West of the March of Dimes, while providing hundreds of thousands of dollars in free publicity and stimulating a 2.2 million person attendance, a regional theme park record, for the opening year of the Marriott entertainment complex.

In 1979, in a Rosica, Mulhern & Associates campaign for Famous Amos cookies, Wally Amos became the national spokesperson for the Literacy Volunteers of America.

In 1982, Nancy Brinker, founder of Susan G. Komen for the Cure was an early pioneer of cause marketing, allowing millions to participate in the fight against breast cancer through businesses that shared Komen's commitment to end the disease.

Recent interest in cause-related marketing is generally argued to stem from American Express, which apparently coined the phrase in 1983. Following various pilot schemes in 1981, American Express developed a campaign to donate funds to a number of different non-profit organizations as part of the San Francisco Arts Festival. Every time someone used an American Express Card in the area, a two cent donation was triggered, and each time new members applied for a card a larger contribution was made. The marketing goals that American Express had for this program were apparently exceeded. Card usage was reported as having increased significantly and relationships between American Express and their merchants also improved as a result of the promotion. From the charity's point of view, despite being a short-term campaign, $108,000 was raised, making a significant contribution to their work. The terms "cause-related marketing" and "cause marketing" have continued to grow in usage since that time. In more recent years the term has come to describe a wider variety of marketing initiatives based on the cooperative efforts of business and charitable causes.

== Background ==
According to a 2007 report published by onPhilanthropy, cause marketing sponsorship by American businesses was rising at a dramatic rate. Citing an IEG, Inc. study, $1.11 billion was spent in 2005, an estimated $1.34 billion in 2006, and the number rose further in 2007. As an update, IEG reported that cause marketing grew 3.9% to reach $1.85 billion in 2014. For 2015 they forecast 3.7% growth for cause marketing, to reach $1.92 billion.

Cause-related marketing is a powerful marketing tool that business and nonprofit organizations are increasingly leveraging. According to the Cone Millennial Cause Study in 2006, 89% of Americans (aged 13 to 25) would switch from one brand to another brand of a comparable product (and price) if the latter brand was associated with "good cause". The same study also indicated that a significant percentage surveyed would prefer to work for a company that was considered socially responsible. This can be linked to the increase in workplace giving programs. Earlier studies by Cone indicate an upward trend in the number of Americans who associate their own buying habits with cause marketing as well as an expectation that companies be "good corporate citizens". These studies also show a substantial increase from just before to just after the September 11, 2001 attacks.

Other studies also show that cause-related marketing helped to increase a company's profits. For example, in the cause marketing campaign by American Express (to which the term "cause marketing" is attributed), the company saw a 17% increase in new users and a 28% increase in card usage. CSR voluntarily initiated by firms results in more opportunities for profit than CSR mandated by the government.

== Benefits and concerns ==
The possible benefits of cause marketing for nonprofit organizations include an increased ability to promote the nonprofit organization's cause via the greater financial resources of a business, and an increased ability to reach possible supporters through a company's customer base. The possible benefits of cause marketing for business include positive public relations, improved customer relations, additional marketing opportunities, and making more money. These benefits occur because this marketing model gives the consumer the feeling of being a philanthropist while doing something as simple as buying a pair of shoes.

There are some concerns related to cause marketing. The issue of trust has emerged as central to the potential for the impact of cause marketing. Specifically, 78% of consumers reported that a partnership between a nonprofit and a company that they trust makes a cause stand out. If a consumer doesn't trust the business that is behind the cause marketing campaign, it can be seen as an insincere effort to attract more loyalty from consumers. For that reason, it is important that the cause marketing campaign be authentic to the brand image of the products that are running the marketing campaign. Another potential issue with cause marketing is the possible increase in the price of the cause-related products. Only 19% of consumers would be willing to buy a more expensive brand if it supported a cause. Consumers are also not sure about how much money actually gets donated.

Cause Marketing has a smaller effect on the happiness of the consumer than regular donations. Also, people who bought such a product are less likely to donate for the cause thus leading to an eventual decline in funding.

== Online cause marketing ==
=== Overview ===
Cause marketing has been conducted more through online channels in recent years. This is due in part to the increasing percentage of households with internet connections. As with other types of marketing campaigns, companies can leverage online marketing channels along with other offline channels such as print and media (sometimes referred to as integrated marketing).

The advent of online cause marketing has allowed consumers, for example those who are loyalty program members, to take a far more active role in cause marketing. This is democratized transactional giving. It means consumers, rather than companies, decide which causes to support and advocate for. An example would be a company allowing its loyalty program members to convert unredeemed rewards, such as points or miles, into cash donations to causes of the customers' own choosing, rather than having the company select the charities. An online platform is necessary to connect the customers to a large-enough selection of charities.

=== Online charity auctions ===
In recent years, online auctions have been used in cause marketing strategies using a number of different online auction platforms. Companies have created programs to help sellers and corporations donate a percentage of their sales to a nonprofit organization through the use of auctions. Businesses and nonprofit organizations can also use the program for cause marketing and nonprofit fundraising programs.

== Types ==
Cause marketing can take on many forms, including:

Transactional Campaigns: A corporate donation triggered by a consumer action (e.g. sharing a message social media, making a purchase, etc.), and Non-Transactional Campaigns: A corporate donation to a cause that is not contingent on an explicit action of the consumer.

Point of Sale Campaigns: A donation solicited by a company at the point of sale but made by the consumer (e.g. consumers are asked to round up their purchase or donate a dollar when they check out online or in-stores).

Message-Focused Campaigns: Business resources are used to share a cause-focused message. For example, a campaign that encourages behavior change (e.g. don't text and drive), drives awareness about an important cause (e.g. talking with elderly parents about driving), or encourages consumer action (e.g. signing a petition to save whales from captivity).

Portion of Purchase: Businesses donate a portion of their sales to a nonprofit or cause.

Pin Ups: Primarily for in-house use. Customers will donate and fill our their name on a paper icon, which will then be hung up in the store.

Buy One Give One: Businesses will donate a product with comparable value to a designated product based on each sale of that product.

Volunteerism: Rather than asking for a donation, businesses will ask if customers will volunteer their time to a certain organization.

Digital Engagement: Businesses create a "digital experience" using social media and software engineers to spread awareness and raise funds for a cause or nonprofit.

== See also ==
- Corporate image
- Foundation (charity)
- Greenwashing
- List of marketing topics
- Public relations
