= Demerit good =

Thing that satisfies human wants but at unhealthy physical or behavioral cost

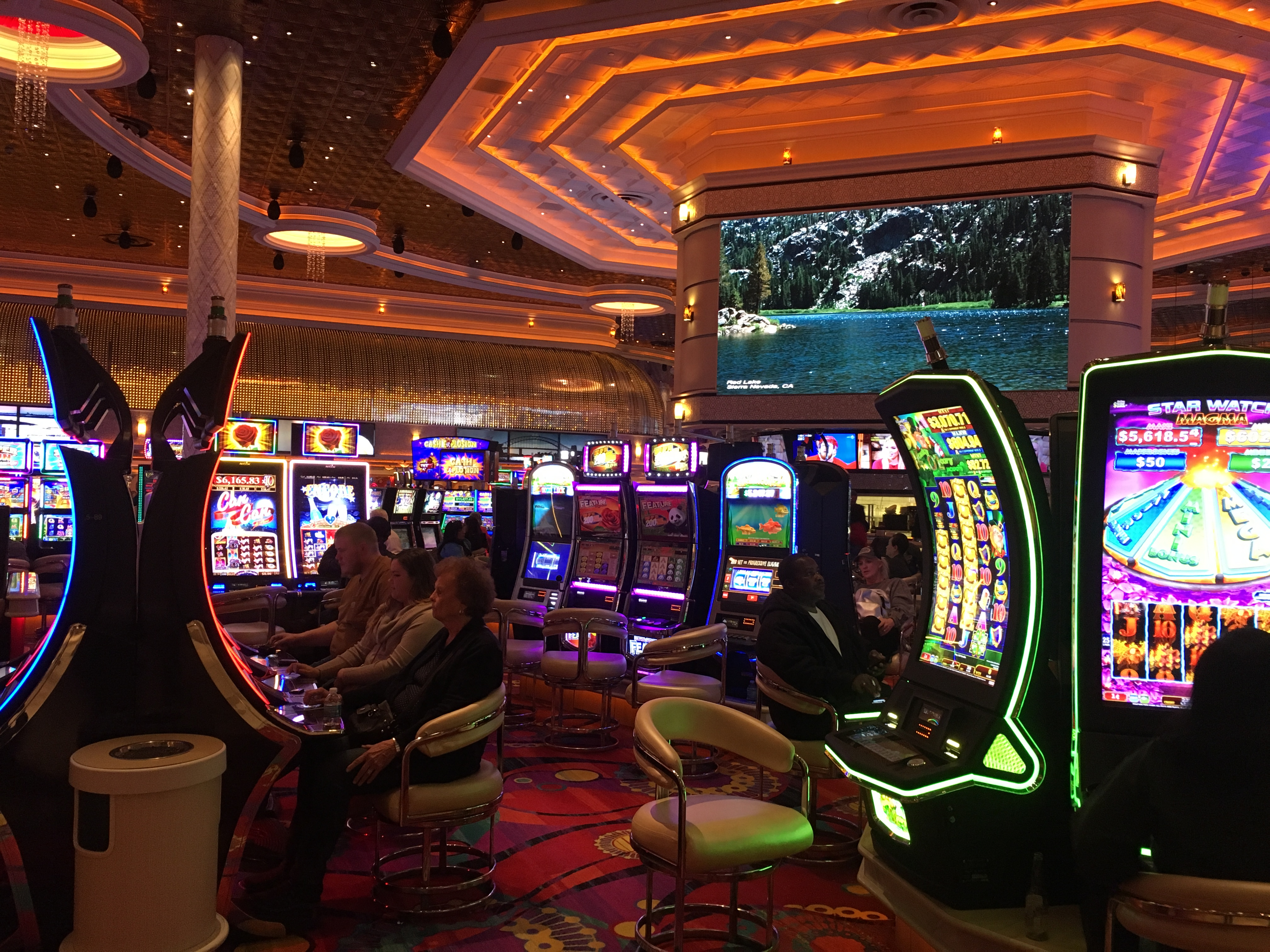
Governments often regulate casinos with restrictions on site locations, wagering rules, or opening hours or with sin taxes, due to perceived social costs associated with gambling.

In economics, a demerit good is "a good or service whose consumption is considered unhealthy, degrading, or otherwise socially undesirable due to the perceived negative effects on the consumers themselves"; it could be over-consumed if left to market forces of supply and demand. Examples of demerit goods include tobacco, alcoholic beverages, recreational drugs, gambling and junk food. Because of the nature of these goods, governments often levy taxes on these goods (specifically, sin taxes), in some cases regulating or banning consumption or advertisement of these goods.

== Concept ==
There is an important conceptual distinction between a demerit good and a negative externality. A negative externality occurs when the consumption of a good has measurable negative consequences on others who do not consume the good themselves. Pollution (due, for example, to automobile use) is the canonical example of a negative externality. By contrast, a demerit good is considered as undesirable because its consumption has negative effects upon the consumer. Cigarettes have both properties: they are a demerit good because they damage the smoker's own health and also produce the negative externality of damage to others by second-hand smoke.

Two fundamental opinions of welfare economics, welfarism and paternalism, differ in their conceptual treatment of "demerit goods". Simply, welfarism considers the individual's own perception of the utility of a good as the final judgement of the utility of the good for that person, and thereby disallows the concept of a 'demerit good' (while allowing the analysis of negative externalities). As an extreme example, if a heroin addict purchases heroin, they must have done so because heroin makes them better somehow, and this transaction is considered therefore as a net social positive (assuming that the addict does not commit any other crimes as the result of their addiction). Paternalism judges that heroin "isn't good for you", and feels free to override the judgement of the addicts themselves.

== See also ==
- Alcohol law
- Alcohol tax
- Pigovian tax
- Soda tax
- Tobacco taxation
