= History of the Soviet Union (1964–1982) =

Brezhnev era
- 1964–1982
History of the Soviet Union (1953–1964)	History of the Soviet Union (1982–1991)
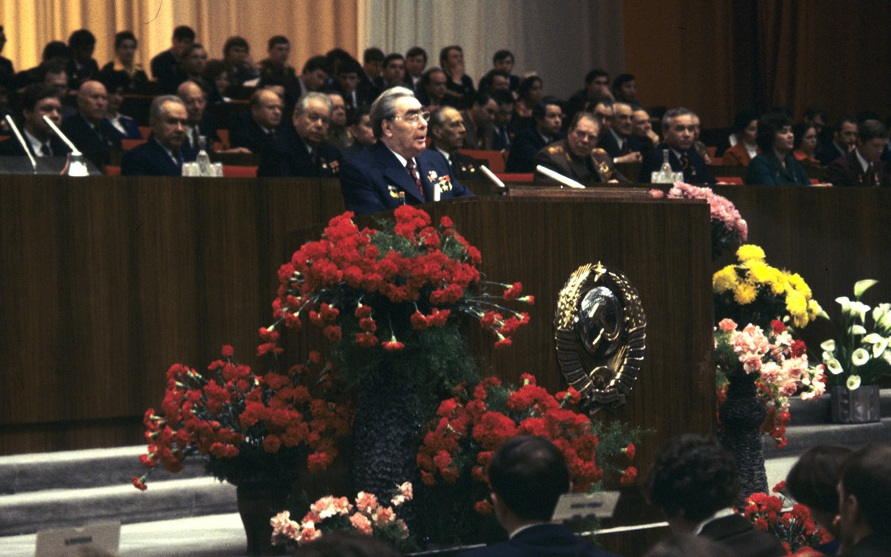
- Leonid Brezhnev speaking at 18th Komsomol Congress opening (25 April 1978)
- Location: Soviet Union
- Including: Cold War
- Leader: Leonid Brezhnev
- Key events: 1965 Yerevan demonstrations Vietnam War; 30 September Movement; Indonesian mass killings of 1965–66; Indonesia–Malaysia confrontation Six-Day War; Warsaw Pact invasion of Czechoslovakia; The Troubles; Congo Crisis; 1973 Chilean coup d'état Détente; Angolan Civil War; Fall of Saigon; Dirty War; Ogaden War; Cambodian–Vietnamese War; Soviet–Afghan War; 1980 Summer Olympics; 1981 Polish hunger demonstrations Death and state funeral of Leonid Brezhnev

The history of the Soviet Union from 1964 to 1982, referred to as the Brezhnev Era, covers the period of Leonid Brezhnev's leadership of the Union of Soviet Socialist Republics (USSR). This period began with high economic growth and soaring prosperity, but gradually significant problems in social, political, and economic areas accumulated, so that the period is often described as the Era of Stagnation. In the 1970s, the Soviet Union and the United States both took a stance of "detente". The goal of this strategy was to warm up relations, in the hope that the Soviet Union would pursue economic and democratic reforms. However, this did not come until Mikhail Gorbachev took office in 1985.

Nikita Khrushchev was ousted as First Secretary of the Central Committee of the Communist Party of the Soviet Union (as well as Chairman of the Council of Ministers) on 14 October 1964, due to his failed reforms and the disregard for Party and Government institutions. Brezhnev replaced Khrushchev as First Secretary and Alexei Kosygin replaced him as Chairman of the Council of Ministers. Anastas Mikoyan, and later Nikolai Podgorny, became Chairmen of the Presidium of the Supreme Soviet. Together with Andrei Kirilenko as organizational secretary, and Mikhail Suslov as Chief Ideologue, they made up a reinvigorated collective leadership, which contrasted in form with the autocracy that characterized Khrushchev's leadership.

The collective leadership first set out to stabilize the Soviet Union and calm Soviet society, a task which they were able to accomplish. In addition, they attempted to speed up economic growth, which had slowed considerably during Khrushchev's last years as the leader of the party. In 1965, Kosygin initiated several reforms to decentralize the Soviet economy. After initial success in creating economic growth, hard-liners within the Party halted the reforms, fearing that they would weaken the Party's prestige and power. The reforms themselves were never officially abolished, they were simply sidelined and stopped having any effect. No other radical economic reforms were carried out during the Brezhnev era, and economic growth began to stagnate in the early-to-mid-1970s. By Brezhnev's death in 1982, Soviet economic growth had, according to several historians, nearly come to a standstill.

The stabilization policy brought about after Khrushchev's removal established a ruling gerontocracy, and political corruption became a normal phenomenon. Brezhnev, however, never initiated any large-scale anti-corruption campaigns. Due to the large military buildup of the 1960s, the Soviet Union was able to consolidate itself as a superpower during Brezhnev's leadership. The era ended with Brezhnev's death on 10 November 1982.

== Politics ==
=== Collectivity of leadership ===
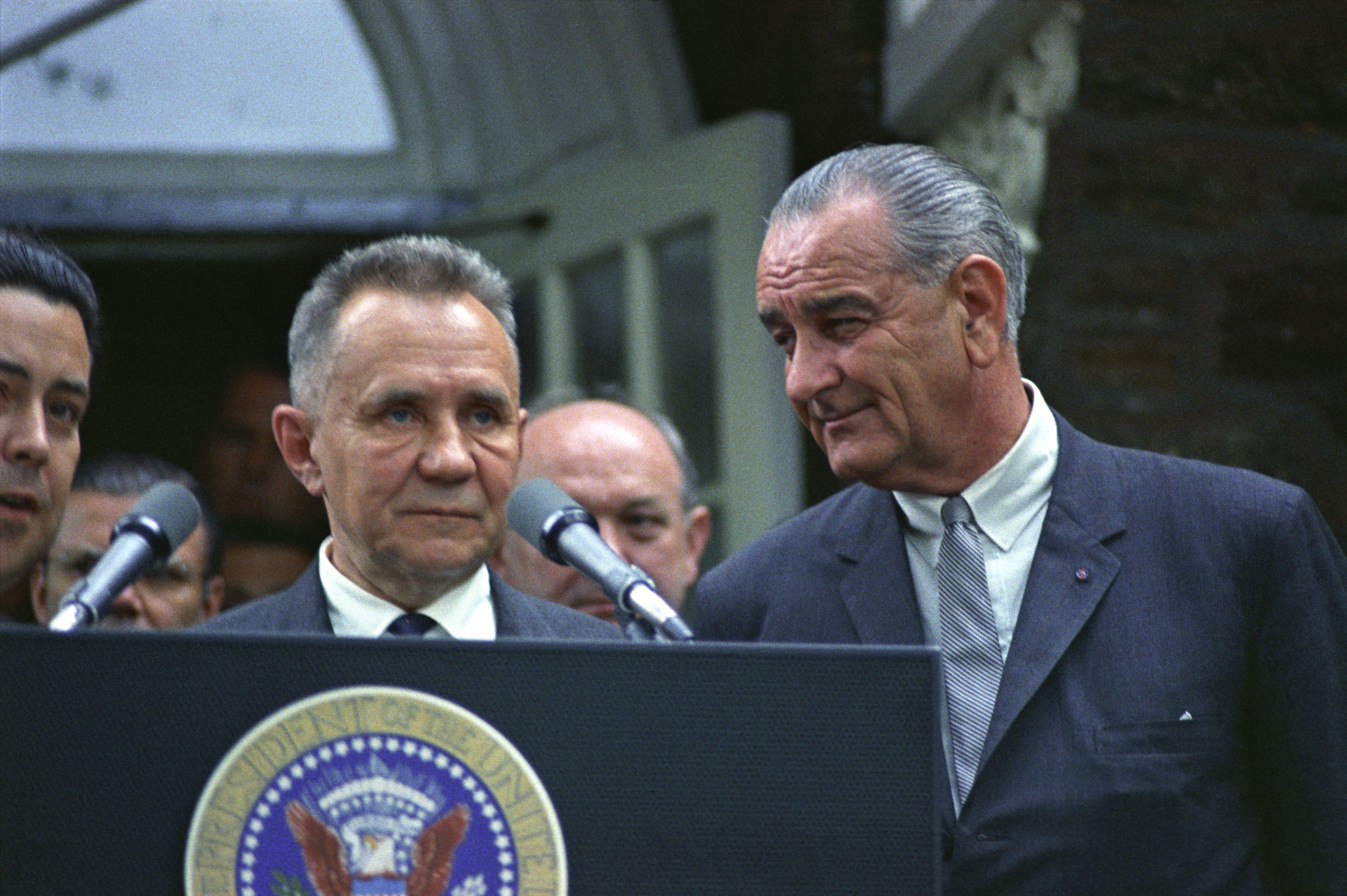
Alexei Kosygin, a member of the collective leadership, with Lyndon B. Johnson, President of the United States, at the 1967 Glassboro Summit Conference

After a prolonged power struggle, Khrushchev was finally ousted from his post as First Secretary in October 1964, charged with the failure of his reforms, his obsessive re-organizations of the Party and Government apparatus, his disregard for Party and Government institutions, and his one-man domineering leadership style. The Presidium (Politburo), the Central Committee and other important Party–Government bodies had grown tired of Khrushchev's repeated violations of established Party principles. The Soviet leadership also believed that his individualistic leadership style ran contrary to the ideal collective leadership. Leonid Brezhnev and Alexei Kosygin succeeded Khrushchev in his posts as First Secretary and Premier respectively, and Mikhail Suslov, Andrei Kirilenko, and Anastas Mikoyan (replaced in 1965 by Nikolai Podgorny), were also given prominence in the new leadership. Together they formed a functional collective leadership.

The collective leadership was, in its early stages, usually referred to as the "Brezhnev–Kosygin" leadership and the pair began their respective periods in office on a relatively equal footing. After Kosygin initiated the economic reform of 1965, however, his prestige within the Soviet leadership withered and his subsequent loss of power strengthened Brezhnev's position within the Soviet hierarchy. Kosygin's influence was further weakened when Podgorny took his post as the second-most powerful figure in the Soviet Union.

Brezhnev conspired to oust Podgorny from the collective leadership as early as 1970. The reason was simple: Brezhnev was third, while Podgorny was first in the ranking of Soviet diplomatic protocol; Podgorny's removal would have made Brezhnev head of state, and his political power would have increased significantly. For much of the period, however, Brezhnev was unable to have Podgorny removed, because he could not count on enough votes in the Politburo, since the removal of Podgorny would have meant weakening of the power and the prestige of the collective leadership itself. Indeed, Podgorny continued to acquire greater power as the head of state throughout the early 1970s, due to Brezhnev's liberal stance on Yugoslavia and his disarmament talks with some Western powers, policies which many Soviet officials saw as contrary to common communist principles.

This did not remain the case, however. Brezhnev strengthened his position considerably during the early to mid-1970s within the Party leadership and by a further weakening of the "Kosygin faction"; by 1977 he had enough support in the Politburo to oust Podgorny from office and active politics in general. Podgorny's eventual removal in 1977 had the effect of reducing Kosygin's role in day-to-day management of government activities by strengthening the powers of the government apparatus led by Brezhnev. After Podgorny's removal rumours started circulating Soviet society that Kosygin was about to retire due to his deteriorating health condition. Nikolai Tikhonov, a First Deputy Chairman of the Council of Ministers under Kosygin, succeeded the latter as premier in 1980 (see Kosygin's resignation).

Podgorny's fall was not seen as the end of the collective leadership, and Suslov continued to write several ideological documents about it. In 1978, one year after Podgorny's retirement, Suslov made several references to the collective leadership in his ideological works. It was around this time that Kirilenko's power and prestige within the Soviet leadership started to wane. Indeed, towards the end of the period, Brezhnev was regarded as too old to simultaneously exercise all of the functions of head of state by his colleagues. With this in mind, the Supreme Soviet, on Brezhnev's orders, established the new post of First Deputy Chairman of the Presidium of the Supreme Soviet, a post akin to a "vice president". The Supreme Soviet unanimously approved Vasili Kuznetsov, at the age of 76, to be First Deputy Chairman of the Presidium in late 1977. As Brezhnev's health worsened, the collective leadership took an even more important role in everyday decision-making. For this reason, Brezhnev's death did not alter the balance of power in any radical fashion, and Yuri Andropov and Konstantin Chernenko were obliged by protocol to lead the country in the same fashion as Brezhnev left it.

=== Assassination attempt ===
Viktor Ilyin, a disenfranchised Soviet soldier, attempted to assassinate Brezhnev on 22 January 1969 by firing shots at a motorcade carrying Brezhnev through Moscow. Though Brezhnev was unhurt, the shots killed a driver and lightly injured several celebrated cosmonauts of the Soviet space programme who were also travelling in the motorcade. Brezhnev's attacker was captured, and interrogated personally by Andropov, then KGB chairman and future Soviet leader. Ilyin was not given the death penalty because his desire to kill Brezhnev was considered so absurd that he was sent to the Kazan mental asylum instead for treatment.

=== Defense policy ===
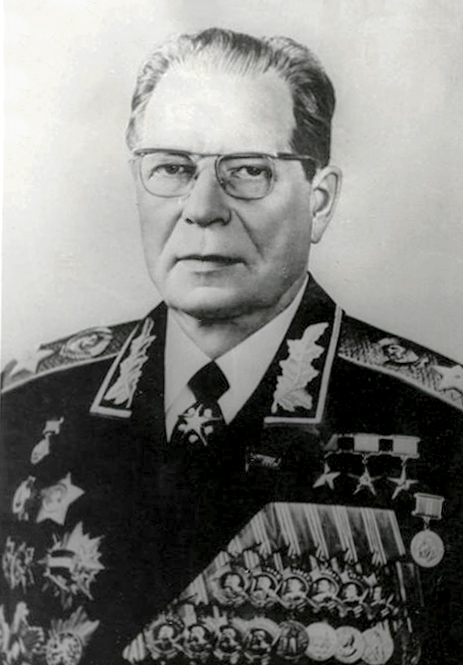
Dmitriy Ustinov, Minister of Defense from 1976 to 1984, dominated Soviet national security policy alongside Andrei Gromyko and Yuri Andropov during the final years of Brezhnev's leadership.

The Soviet Union launched a large military build-up in 1965 by expanding both nuclear and conventional arsenals. The Soviet leadership believed a strong military would be useful leverage in negotiating with foreign powers, and increase the Eastern Bloc's security from attacks. In the 1970s, the Soviet leadership concluded that a war with the capitalist countries might not necessarily become nuclear, and therefore they initiated a rapid expansion of the Soviet conventional forces. Due to the Soviet Union's relatively weaker infrastructure compared to the United States, the Soviet leadership believed that the only way to surpass the First World was by a rapid military conquest of Western Europe, relying on sheer numbers alone. The Soviet Union achieved nuclear parity with the United States by the early 1970s, after which the country consolidated itself as a superpower. The apparent success of the military build-up led the Soviet leadership to believe that the military, and the military alone, according to Willard Frank, "bought the Soviet Union security and influence".

Brezhnev had, according to some of his closest advisors, been concerned for a very long time about the growing military expenditure in the 1960s. Advisers have recounted how Brezhnev came into conflict with several top-level military industrialists, the most notable being Marshal Andrei Grechko, the Minister of Defense. In the early 1970s, according to Anatoly Aleksandrov-Agentov, one of Brezhnev's closest advisers, Brezhnev attended a five-hour meeting to try to convince the Soviet military establishment to reduce military spending. In the meeting an irritated Brezhnev asked why the Soviet Union should, in the words of Matthew Evangelista, "continue to exhaust" the economy if the country could not be promised a military parity with the West; the question was left unanswered. When Grechko died in 1976, Dmitriy Ustinov took his place as Defense Minister. Ustinov, although a close associate and friend of Brezhnev, hindered any attempt made by Brezhnev to reduce national military expenditure. In his later years, Brezhnev lacked the will to reduce defense expenditure, due to his declining health. According to the Soviet diplomat Georgy Arbatov, the military–industrial complex functioned as Brezhnev's power base within the Soviet hierarchy even if he tried to scale-down investments.

At the 23rd Party Congress in 1966, Brezhnev told the delegates that the Soviet military had reached a level fully sufficient to defend the country. The Soviet Union reached ICBM parity with the United States that year. In early 1977, Brezhnev told the world that the Soviet Union did not seek to become superior to the United States in nuclear weapons, nor to be militarily superior in any sense of the word. In the later years of Brezhnev's reign, it became official defense policy to only invest enough to maintain military deterrence, and by the 1980s, Soviet defense officials were told again that investment would not exceed the level to retain national security. In his last meeting with Soviet military leaders in October 1982, Brezhnev stressed the importance of not over-investing in the Soviet military sector. This policy was retained during the leaderships of Andropov, Konstantin Chernenko and Mikhail Gorbachev. He also said that the time was opportune to increase the readiness of the armed forces even further. At the anniversary of the 1917 Revolution a few weeks later (Brezhnev's final public appearance), Western observers noted that the annual military parade featured only two new weapons and most of the equipment displayed was obsolete. Two days before his death, Brezhnev stated that any aggression against the Soviet Union "would result in a crushing retaliatory blow".

=== Stabilization ===
Though Brezhnev's time in office would later be characterized as one of stability, early on, Brezhnev oversaw the replacement of half of the regional leaders and Politburo members. This was a typical move for a Soviet leader trying to strengthen his power base. Examples of Politburo members who lost their membership during the Brezhnev Era are Gennady Voronov, Dmitry Polyansky, Alexander Shelepin, Petro Shelest and Podgorny. Polyansky and Voronov lost their membership in the Politburo because they were considered to be members of the "Kosygin faction." In their place came Andrei Grechko, the Minister of Defense, Andrei Gromyko the Minister of Foreign Affairs and KGB Chairman Andropov. The removal and replacement of members of the Soviet leadership halted in late 1970s.

Initially, in fact, Brezhnev portrayed himself as a moderate — not as radical as Kosygin but not as conservative as Shelepin. Brezhnev gave the Central Committee formal permission to initiate Kosygin's 1965 economic reform. According to historian Robert Service, Brezhnev did modify some of Kosygin's reform proposals, many of which were unhelpful at best. In his early days, Brezhnev asked for advice from provincial party secretaries, and spent hours each day on such conversations. During the March 1965 Central Committee plenum, Brezhnev took control of Soviet agriculture, another hint that he opposed Kosygin's reform program. Brezhnev believed, in contrast to Khrushchev, that rather than wholesale re-organization, the key to increasing agricultural output was making the existing system work more efficiently.

In the late 1960s, Brezhnev talked of the need to "renew" the party cadres, but according to Robert Service, his "self-interest discouraged him from putting an end to the immobilism he detected. He did not want to risk alienating lower-level officialdom." The Politburo saw the policy of stabilization as the only way to avoid returning to Joseph Stalin's purges and Khrushchev's re-organization of Party-Government institutions. Members acted in optimism, and believed a policy of stabilization would prove to the world, according to Robert Service, the "superiority of communism". The Soviet leadership was not entirely opposed to reform, even if the reform movement had been weakened in the aftermath of the Prague Spring in the Czechoslovakia. The result was a period of overt stabilization at the heart of government, a policy which also had the effect of reducing cultural freedom: several dissident samizdats were shut down.

=== Gerontocracy ===
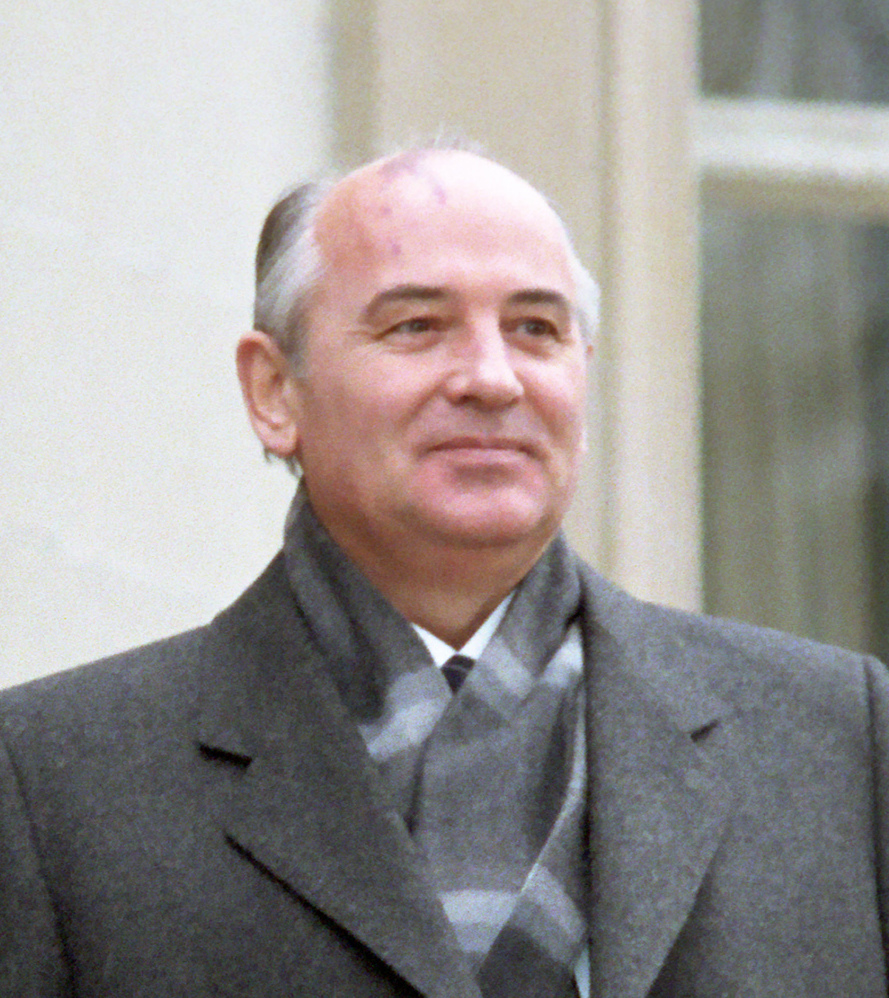
Mikhail Gorbachev, as seen in 1985. Along with Grigory Romanov he was, in contrast to the norm, one of the young members elected to top positions during the Brezhnev Era

After the reshuffling process of the Politburo ended in the mid-to-late 1970s, the Soviet leadership evolved into a gerontocracy, a form of governance in which the leaders are significantly older than most of the adult population.

The Brezhnev generation — the people who lived and worked during the Brezhnev Era — owed their rise to prominence to Joseph Stalin's Great Purge in the late 1930s. In the purge, Stalin ordered the execution or exile of nearly all Soviet bureaucrats over the age of 35, thereby opening up posts and offices for a younger generation of Soviets. This generation would lead the country from the aftermath of Stalin's purge up to Mikhail Gorbachev's rise to power in 1985. The majority of these appointees were of either peasant or working class origin. Mikhail Suslov, Alexei Kosygin, and Brezhnev are prime examples of men appointed in the aftermath of Stalin's Great Purge.

The average age of the Politburo's members was 58 years in 1961, and 71 in 1981. A similar greying also took place in the Central Committee, the median age rising from 53 in 1961 to 62 in 1981, with the proportion of members older than 65 increasing from 3 percent in 1961 to 39 percent in 1981. The difference in the median age between Politburo and Central Committee members can be explained by the fact that the Central Committee was consistently enlarged during Brezhnev's leadership; this made it possible to appoint new and younger members to the Central Committee without retiring some of its oldest members. Of the 319-member Central Committee in 1981, 130 were younger than 30 when Stalin died in 1953.

Young politicians, such as Fyodor Kulakov and Grigory Romanov, were seen as potential successors to Brezhnev, but none of them came close. For example, Kulakov, one of the youngest members in the Politburo, was ranked seventh in the prestige order voted by the Supreme Soviet, far behind such notables as Kosygin, Podgorny, Suslov, and Kirilenko. As Edwin Bacon and Mark Sandle note in their book, Brezhnev Reconsidered, the Soviet leadership at Brezhnev's deathbed had evolved into "a gerontocracy increasingly lacking of physical and intellectual vigour".

=== New constitution ===
A souvenir sheet commemorating the 1977 Soviet Constitution, Brezhnev is depicted in the middle

During the era, Brezhnev was also the Chairman of the Constitutional Commission of the Supreme Soviet, which worked for the creation of a new constitution. The commission had 97 members, with Konstantin Chernenko among the more prominent. Brezhnev was not driven by a wish to leave a mark on history, but rather to even further weaken Premier Alexei Kosygin's prestige. The formulation of the constitution kept with Brezhnev's political style and was neither anti-Stalinist nor neo-Stalinist, but stuck to a middle path, following most of the same principles and ideas as the previous constitutions. The most notable difference was that it codified the developmental changes which the Soviet Union had passed through since the formulation of the 1936 Constitution. It described the Soviet Union, for example, as an "advanced industrial society". In this sense, the resulting document can be seen as proof of the achievements, as well as the limits, of de-Stalinization. It enhanced the status of the individual in all matters of life, while at the same time solidifying the Party's hold on power.

During the drafting process, a debate within the Soviet leadership took place between the two factions on whether to call Soviet law "State law" or "Constitutional law." Those who supported the thesis of state law believed that the Constitution was of low importance, and that it could be changed whenever the socio-economic system changed. Those who supported Constitutional law believed that the Constitution should "conceptualise" and incorporate some of the Party's future ideological goals. They also wanted to include information on the status of the Soviet citizen, which had changed drastically in the post-Stalin years. Constitutional thought prevailed to an extent, and the 1977 Soviet Constitution had a greater effect on conceptualising the Soviet system.

=== Later years ===
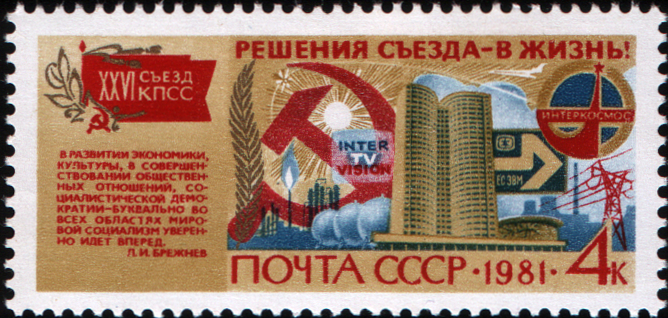
A Soviet stamp from 1981 devoted to the 26th Party Congress

In his later years, Brezhnev developed his own cult of personality, and awarded himself the highest military decorations of the Soviet Union. The media extolled Brezhnev "as a dynamic leader and intellectual colossus". Brezhnev was awarded a Lenin Prize for Literature for Brezhnev's trilogy, three auto-biographical novels. These awards were given to Brezhnev to bolster his position within the Party and the Politburo. When Alexei Kosygin died on 18 December 1980, one day before Brezhnev's birthday, Pravda and other media outlets postponed the reporting of his death until after Brezhnev's birthday celebration. In reality, however, Brezhnev's physical and intellectual capacities had started to decline in the 1970s from bad health.

Brezhnev approved the Soviet intervention in Afghanistan (see also Soviet–Afghan relations) just as he had previously approved the Warsaw Pact invasion of Czechoslovakia. In both cases, Brezhnev was not the one pushing hardest for a possible armed intervention. Several leading members of the Soviet leadership decided to retain Brezhnev as General Secretary so that their careers would not suffer by a possible leadership reshuffling by his successor. Other members, who disliked Brezhnev, among them Dmitriy Ustinov (Minister of Defence), Andrei Gromyko (Minister of Foreign Affairs), and Mikhail Suslov (Central Committee Secretary), feared that Brezhnev's removal would spark a succession crisis, and so they helped to maintain the status quo.

Brezhnev stayed in office under pressure from some of his Politburo associates, though in practice the country was not governed by Brezhnev, but instead by a collective leadership led by Suslov, Ustinov, Gromyko, and Yuri Andropov. Konstantin Chernenko, due to his close relationship with Brezhnev, had also acquired influence. While the Politburo was pondering who would take Brezhnev's place, his health continued to worsen. The choice of a successor would have been influenced by Suslov, but since he died in January 1982, before Brezhnev, Andropov took Suslov's place in the Central Committee Secretariat. With Brezhnev's health worsening, Andropov showed his Politburo colleagues that he was not afraid of Brezhnev's reprisals any more, and launched a major anti-corruption campaign. On 10 November 1982, Brezhnev died and was honored with major state funeral and buried 5 days later at the Kremlin Wall Necropolis.

== Economy ==
=== 1965 reform ===
The 1965 Soviet economic reform, often referred to as the "Kosygin reform", of economic management and planning was carried out between 1965 and 1971. Announced in September 1965, it contained three main measures: the re-centralization of the Soviet economy by re-establishing several central ministries, a decentralizing overhaul of the enterprise incentive system (including wider usage of capitalist-style material incentives for good performance), and thirdly, a major price reform. The reform was initiated by Alexei Kosygin's First Government and implemented during the Eighth Five-Year Plan, 1968–1970.

Though these measures were established to counter many of the irrationalities in the Soviet economic system, the reform did not try to change the existing system radically; it instead tried to improve it gradually. Success was ultimately mixed, and Soviet analyses on why the reform failed to reach its full potential have never given any definitive answers. The key factors are agreed upon, however, with blame being put on the combination of the recentralisation of the economy with the decentralisation of enterprise autonomy, creating several administrative obstacles. Additionally, instead of creating a market which in turn would establish a pricing system, administrators were given the responsibility for overhauling the pricing system themselves. Because of this, the market-like system failed to materialise. To make matters worse, the reform was contradictory at best. In retrospect, however, the Eighth Five-Year Plan as a whole is considered to be one of the most successful periods for the Soviet economy, and the most successful for consumer production.

The marketization of the economy, in which Kosygin supported, was considered too radical in the light of the Prague Spring in Czechoslovakia. Nikolai Ryzhkov, the future Chairman of the Council of Ministers, referred in a 1987 speech to the Supreme Soviet of the Soviet Union to the "sad experiences of the 1965 reform", and claimed that everything went from bad to worse following the reform's cancellation.

=== Era of Stagnation ===
Period	GNP (according to the CIA)	NMP (according to Grigorii Khanin)	NMP (according to the USSR)
1960–1965	4.8	4.4	6.5
1965–1970	4.9	4.1	7.7
1970–1975	3.0	3.2	5.7
1975–1980	1.9	1.0	4.2
1980–1985	1.8	0.6	3.5
(Note: Western specialists believe that the net material product (NMP; Soviet version of gross national product (GNP)) contained distortions and could not accurately determine a country's economic growth; according to some, it greatly exaggerated growth. Because of this, several specialists created GNP figures to estimate Soviet growth and to compare Soviet growth with the growth of capitalist countries. Grigorii Khanin published his growth rates in the 1980s as a "translation" of NMP to GNP. His growth rates were (as seen above) much lower than the official figures, and lower than some Western estimates. His estimates were widely publicised by conservative think tanks as, for instance, The Heritage Foundation of Washington, D.C. After the dissolution of the Soviet Union in 1991, Khanin's estimates led several agencies to criticise the estimates made by the Central Intelligence Agency (CIA). Since then the CIA has often been accused of overestimating Soviet growth. In response to the criticism of CIA's work, a panel led by economist James R. Millar was established to find out if this was in fact true. The panel concluded that the CIA estimates were based on facts, and that "Methodologically, Khanin's approach was naive, and it has not been possible for others to reproduce his results." Michael Boretsky, a US Department of Commerce economist, criticised the CIA estimates for being too low. He used the same CIA methodology to estimate West German and American growth rates. The results were 32 percent below the official GNP growth for West Germany and 13 below the official GNP growth for the United States. In the end, the conclusion is the same, the Soviet Union grew rapidly economically until the mid-1970s, when a system crisis set in. Growth figures for the Soviet economy vary widely (as seen below): Eighth Five-Year Plan (1966–1970): Gross national product (GNP): 5.2 percent; GNP: 5.3 percent; Gross national income (GNI): 7.1 percent; Capital investments in agriculture: 24 percent; Ninth Five-Year Plan (1971–1975): GNP: 3.7 percent; GNI: 5.1 percent; Labour productivity: 6 percent; Capital investments in agriculture: 27 percent; Tenth Five-Year Plan (1976–1980): GNP: 2.7 percent; GNP: 3 percent; Labour productivity: 3.2 percent; Eleventh Five-Year Plan (1981–1985))

The value of all consumer goods manufactured in 1972 in retail prices was about 118 billion rubles ($530 billion). The Era of Stagnation, a term coined by Mikhail Gorbachev, is considered by several economists to be the worst financial crisis in the Soviet Union. It was triggered by the Nixon Shock, over-centralisation and a conservative state bureaucracy. As the economy grew, the volume of decisions facing planners in Moscow became overwhelming. As a result, labour productivity decreased nationwide. The cumbersome procedures of bureaucratic administration did not allow for the free communication and flexible response required at the enterprise level to deal with worker alienation, innovation, customers and suppliers. The late Brezhnev Era also saw an increase in political corruption. Data falsification became common practice among bureaucrats to report satisfied targets and quotas to the government, and this further aggravated the crisis in planning.

With the mounting economic problems, skilled workers were usually paid more than had been intended in the first place, while unskilled labourers tended to turn up late, and were neither conscientious nor, in a number of cases, entirely sober. The state usually moved workers from one job to another which ultimately became an ineradicable feature in Soviet industry; the Government had no effective counter-measure because of the country's lack of unemployment. Government industries such as factories, mines and offices were staffed by undisciplined personnel who put a great effort into not doing their jobs. This ultimately led to, according to Robert Service, a "work-shy workforce" among Soviet workers and administrators.

==== 1973 and 1979 reform ====
Kosygin initiated the 1973 Soviet economic reform to enhance the powers and functions of the regional planners by establishing associations. The reform was never fully implemented; indeed, members of the Soviet leadership complained that the reform had not even begun by the time of the 1979 reform. The 1979 Soviet economic reform was initiated to improve the then-stagnating Soviet economy. The reform's goal was to increase the powers of the central ministries by centralising the Soviet economy to an even greater extent. This reform was also never fully implemented, and when Kosygin died in 1980 it was practically abandoned by his successor, Nikolai Tikhonov. Tikhonov told the Soviet people at the 26th Party Congress that the reform was to be implemented, or at least parts of it, during the Eleventh Five-Year Plan (1981–1985). Despite this, the reform never came to fruition. The reform is seen by several Sovietologists as the last major pre-perestroika reform initiative put forward by the Soviet government.

==== Kosygin's resignation ====
Following Nikolai Podgorny's removal from office, rumours started circulating within the top circles, and on the streets, that Kosygin would retire due to bad health. During one of Kosygin's spells on sick leave, Brezhnev appointed Nikolai Tikhonov, a like-minded conservative, to the post of First Deputy Chairman of the Council of Ministers; through this office Tikhonov was able to reduce Kosygin to a backup role. For example, at a Central Committee plenum in June 1980, the Soviet economic development plan was outlined by Tikhonov, not Kosygin. Following Kosygin's resignation in 1980, Tikhonov, at the age of 75, was elected the new Chairman of the Council of Ministers. At the end of his life, Kosygin feared the complete failure of the Eleventh Five-Year Plan (1981–1985), believing that the sitting leadership was reluctant to reform the stagnant Soviet economy.

== Foreign relations ==
=== First World ===
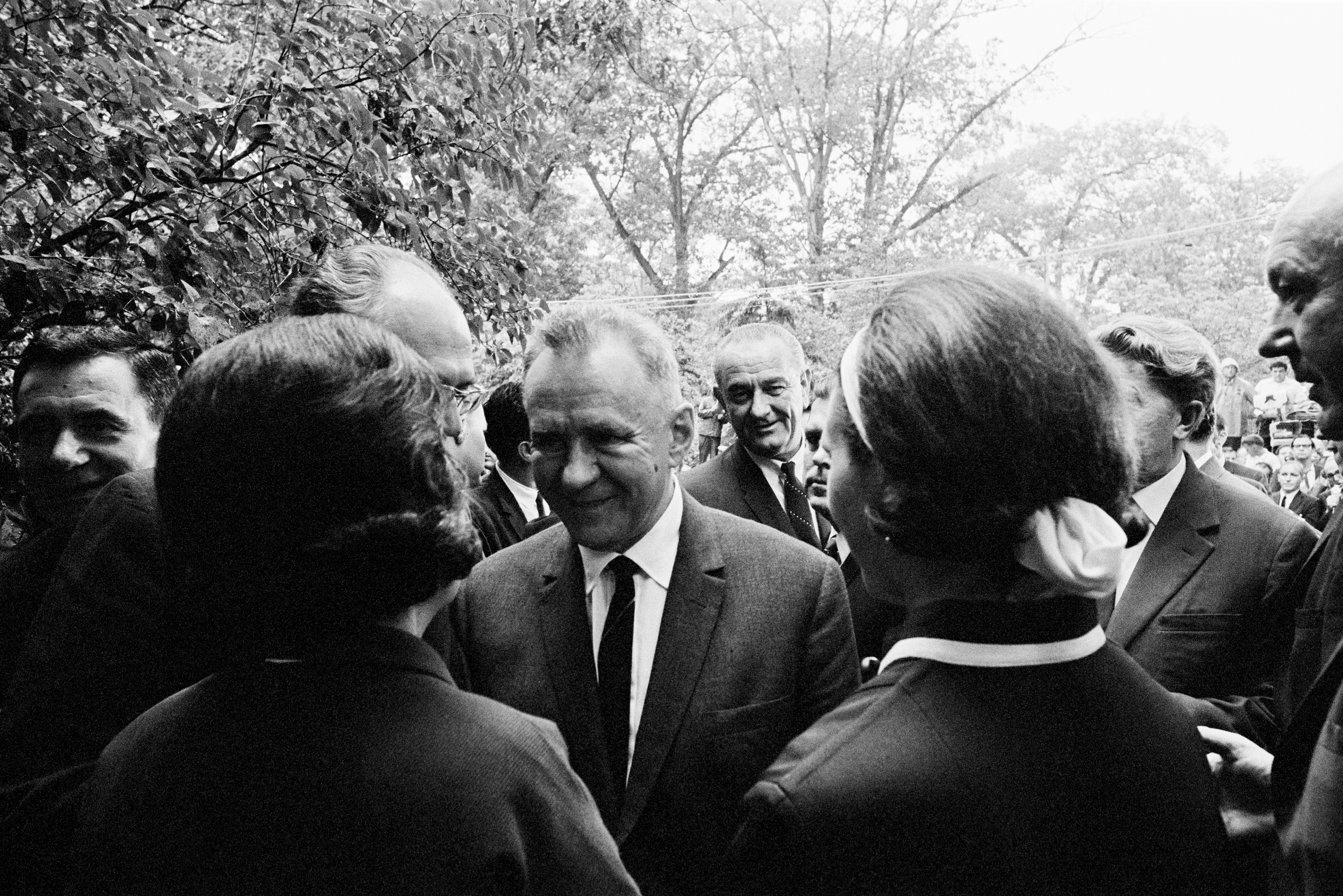
Soviet Premier Alexei Kosygin (in front) next to U.S. President Lyndon B. Johnson (behind) at the Glassboro Summit Conference

Alexei Kosygin, the Soviet Premier, tried to challenge Brezhnev on the rights of the General Secretary to represent the country abroad, a function Kosygin believed should fall into the hands of the Premier, as was common in non-communist countries. This was actually implemented for a short period. Later, however, Kosygin, who had been the chief negotiator with the First World during the 1960s, was hardly to be seen outside the Second World after Brezhnev strengthened his position within the Politburo. Kosygin did head the Soviet Glassboro Summit Conference delegation in 1967 with US President Lyndon B. Johnson. The summit was dominated by three issues: the Vietnam War, the Six-Day War and the Soviet–American arms race. Immediately following the summit at Glassboro, Kosygin headed the Soviet delegation to Cuba, where he met an angry Fidel Castro who accused the Soviet Union of "capitulationism".

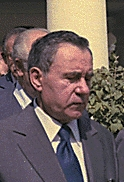
Andrei Gromyko, the Soviet Foreign Minister from 1957 to 1985, as seen in 1978 during a visit to the United States

Détente, literally the easing of strained relations, or in Russian "unloading", was a Brezhnev initiative that characterized 1969 to 1974. It meant "ideological co-existence" in the context of Soviet foreign policy, but it did not, however, entail an end to competition between capitalist and communist societies. The Soviet leadership's policy did, however, help to ease the Soviet Union's strained relations with the United States. Several arms control and trade agreements were signed and ratified in this time period.

One such success of diplomacy came with Willy Brandt's ascension to the West German chancellorship in 1969, as West German–Soviet tension started to ease. Brandt's Ostpolitik policy, along with Brezhnev's détente, contributed to the signing of the Moscow and Warsaw Treaties in which West Germany recognized the state borders established following World War II, which included West German recognition of East Germany as an independent state. The foreign relations of the two countries continued to improve during Brezhnev's leadership, and in the Soviet Union, where the memory of German brutality during World War II was still remembered, these developments contributed to greatly reducing the animosity the Soviet people felt towards Germany, and Germans in general.

Not all efforts were so successful, however. The 1975 Helsinki Accords, a Soviet-led initiative which was hailed as a success for Soviet diplomacy, "backfired", in the words of historian Archie Brown. The U.S. Government retained little interest through the whole process, and Richard Nixon once told a senior British official that the United States "had never wanted the conference". Other notables, such as Nixon's successor President Gerald Ford, and National Security Advisor Henry Kissinger were also unenthusiastic. It was Western European negotiators who played a crucial role in creating the treaty.

The Soviet Union sought an official acceptance of the state borders drawn up in post-war Europe by the United States and Western Europe. The Soviets were largely successful; some small differences were that state borders were "inviolable" rather than "immutable", meaning that borders could be changed only without military interference, or interference from another country. Both Brezhnev, Gromyko and the rest of the Soviet leadership were strongly committed to the creation of such a treaty, even if it meant concessions on such topics as human rights and transparency. Mikhail Suslov and Gromyko, among others, were worried about some of the concessions. Yuri Andropov, the KGB Chairman, believed the greater transparency was weakening the prestige of the KGB, and strengthening the prestige of the Ministry of Foreign Affairs.

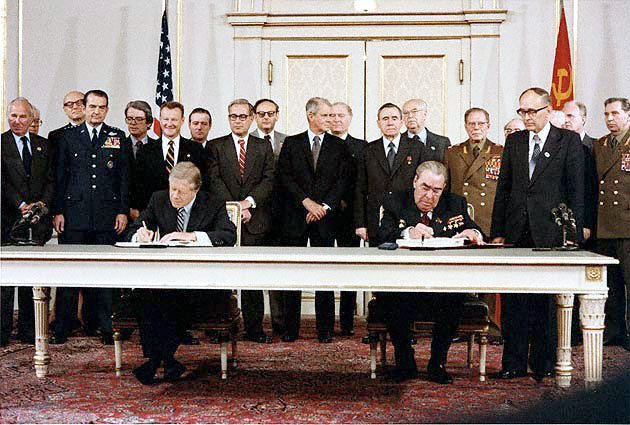
Carter and Brezhnev sign the SALT II treaty on 18 June 1979 in Vienna.

Another blow to Soviet communism in the First World came with the establishment of eurocommunism. Eurocommunists espoused and supported the ideals of Soviet communism while at the same time supporting rights of the individual. The largest obstacle was that it was the largest communist parties, those with highest electoral turnout, which became eurocommunists. Originating with the Prague Spring, this new thinking made the First World more skeptical of Soviet communism in general. The Italian Communist Party notably declared that should war break out in Europe, they would rally to the defense of Italy and resist any Soviet incursion on their nation's soil.

In particular, Soviet–First World relations deteriorated when the US President Jimmy Carter, following the advice of his National Security Adviser Zbigniew Brzezinski, denounced the 1979 Soviet intervention in Afghanistan (see Soviet–Afghan relations) and described it as the "most serious danger to peace since 1945". The United States stopped all grain export to the Soviet Union and persuaded US athletes not to enter the 1980 Summer Olympics held in Moscow. The Soviet Union responded by boycotting the next Summer Olympics held in Los Angeles. The détente policy collapsed. When Ronald Reagan succeeded Carter as US president in 1981, he promised a sharp increase in US defense spending and a more aggressively anti-Soviet foreign policy. This caused alarm in Moscow, with the Soviet media accusing him of "warmongering" and "mistakenly believing that stepping up the arms race will bring peace to the world". General Nikolai Ogarkov also commented that too many Soviet citizens had begun believing that any war was bad and peace at any price was good, and that better political education was necessary to inculcate a "class" point of view in world affairs.

An event of grave embarrassment came in October 1981 when Soviet submarine S-363 ran aground near the Swedish naval base at Karlskrona. As this was a militarily sensitive location, Sweden took an aggressive stance on the incident, detaining the Whiskey-class sub for two weeks as they awaited an official explanation from Moscow. Eventually it was released, but Stockholm refused to accept Soviet claims that this was merely an accident, especially since numerous unidentified submarines had been spotted near the Swedish coast. Sweden also announced that radiation had been detected emanating from the submarine and they believed it to be carrying nuclear missiles. Moscow would neither confirm nor deny this and instead merely accused the Swedes of espionage.

=== China ===
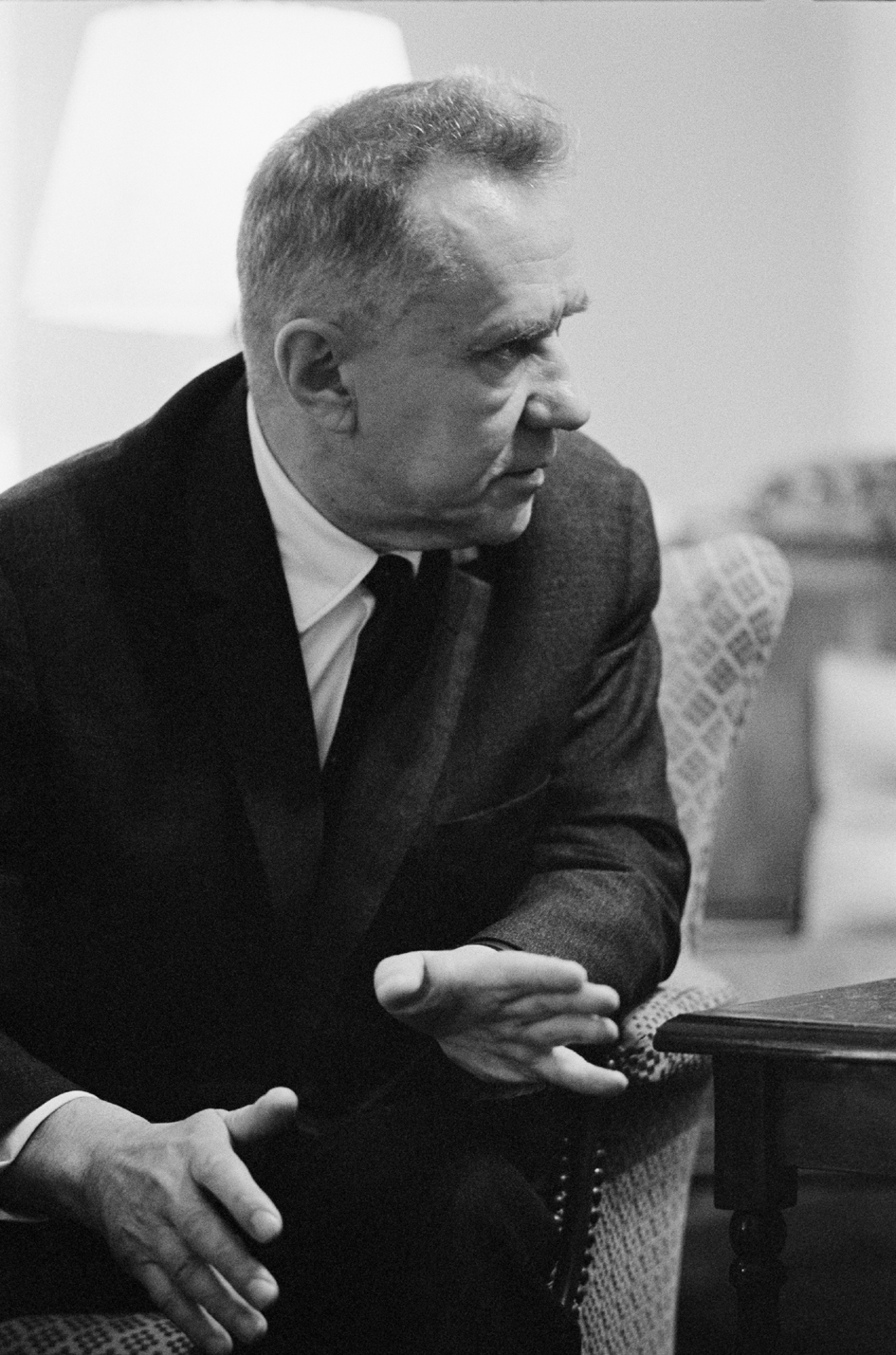
Alexei Kosygin was the most optimistic members of the Soviet leadership regarding the Soviet rapprochement with the PRC

In the aftermath of Khrushchev's removal and the Sino-Soviet split, Alexei Kosygin was the most optimistic member of the Soviet leadership for a future rapprochement with China, while Yuri Andropov remained skeptical and Brezhnev did not even voice his opinion. In many ways, Kosygin even had problems understanding why the two countries were quarreling with each other in the first place. The collective leadership; Anastas Mikoyan, Brezhnev and Kosygin were considered by the PRC to retain the revisionist attitudes of their predecessor, Nikita Khrushchev. At first, the new Soviet leadership blamed the Sino-Soviet split not on the PRC, but on policy errors made by Khrushchev. Both Brezhnev and Kosygin were enthusiastic for rapprochement with the PRC. When Kosygin met his counterpart, the Chinese Premier Zhou Enlai, in 1964, Kosygin found him to be in an "excellent mood". The early hints of rapprochement collapsed, however, when Zhou accused Kosygin of Khrushchev-like behavior after Rodion Malinovsky's anti-imperialistic speech against the First World.

When Kosygin told Brezhnev that it was time to reconcile with China, Brezhnev replied: "If you think this is necessary, then you go by yourself". Kosygin was afraid that China would turn down his proposal for a visit, so he decided to stop off in Beijing on his way to Vietnamese Communist leaders in Hanoi on 5 February 1965; there he met with Zhou. The two were able to solve smaller issues, agreeing to increase trade between the countries, as well as celebrate the 15th anniversary of the Sino-Soviet alliance. Kosygin was told that a reconciliation between the two countries might take years, and that rapprochement could occur only gradually. In his report to the Soviet leadership, Kosygin noted Zhou's moderate stance against the Soviet Union, and believed he was open for serious talks about Sino-Soviet relations. After his visit to Hanoi, Kosygin returned to Beijing on 10 February, this time to meet Mao Zedong personally. At first Mao refused to meet Kosygin, but eventually agreed and the two met on 11 February. His meeting with Mao was in an entirely different tone to the previous meeting with Zhou. Mao criticized Kosygin, and the Soviet leadership, of revisionist behavior. He also continued to criticize Khrushchev's earlier policies. This meeting was to become Mao's last meeting with any Soviet leader.

The Cultural Revolution caused a complete meltdown of Sino-Soviet relations, inasmuch as Moscow (along with every communist state save for Albania) considered that event to be simple-minded insanity. Red Guards denounced the Soviet Union and the entire Eastern Bloc as revisionists who pursued a false socialism and of being in collusion with the forces of imperialism. Brezhnev was referred to as "the new Hitler" and the Soviets as warmongers who neglected their people's living standards in favor of military spending. In 1968 Lin Biao, the Chinese Defence Minister, claimed that the Soviet Union was preparing itself for a war against China. Moscow shot back by accusing China of false socialism and plotting with the US as well as promoting a guns-over-butter economic policy. This tension escalated into small skirmishes alongside the Sino-Soviet border, and both Khrushchev and Brezhnev were derided as "betrayers of [Vladimir] Lenin" by the Chinese. To counter the accusations made by the Chinese Central Government, Brezhnev condemned the PRC's "frenzied anti-Sovietism", and asked Zhou Enlai to follow up on his word to normalize Sino-Soviet relations. In another speech, this time in Tashkent, Uzbek SSR in 1982, Brezhnev warned First World powers of using the Sino-Soviet split against the Soviet Union, saying it would spark "tension and mistrust". Brezhnev had offered a non-aggression pact to China, but its terms included a renunciation of China's territorial claims, and would have left China defenseless against threats from the USSR. In 1972, US president Richard Nixon visited Beijing to restore relations with the PRC, which only seemed to confirm Soviet fears of Sino-US collusion. Relations between Moscow and Beijing remained extremely hostile through the entire decade of the 1970s, the latter deciding that "social" imperialism presented a greater danger than capitalist imperialism, and even after Mao Zedong's death showed no sign of a chill. The Soviet Union had by this time championed an Asian collective security treaty in which they would defend any country against a possible attack from China, but when the latter engaged Vietnam in a border war during early 1979, Moscow contented itself with verbal protests. The Soviet leadership after Brezhnev's death actively pursued a more friendly foreign policy to China, and the normalization of relations which had begun under Brezhnev, continued under his successors.

=== Eastern Bloc ===
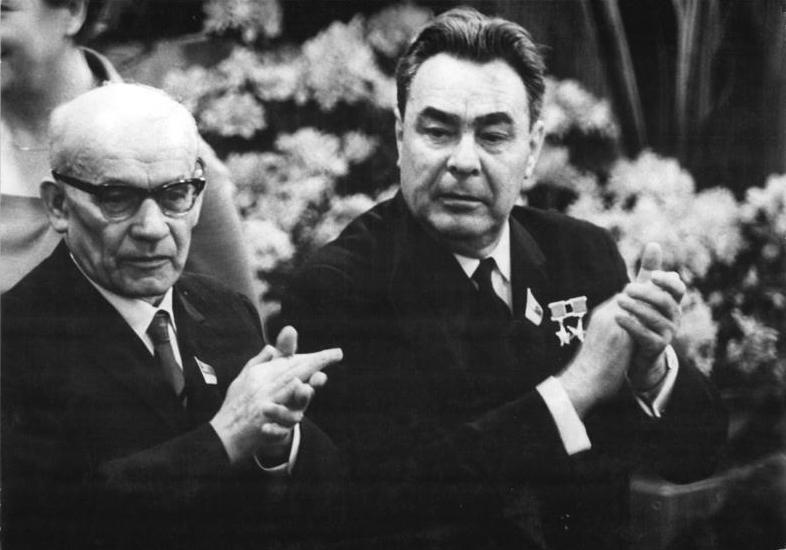
Władysław Gomułka (left), the leader of Poland, in East Germany with Brezhnev.

The Soviet leadership's policy towards the Eastern Bloc did not change much with Khrushchev's replacement, as the states of Eastern Europe were seen as a buffer zone essential to placing distance between NATO and the Soviet Union's borders. The Brezhnev regime inherited a skeptical attitude towards reform policies which became more radical in tone following the Prague Spring in 1968. János Kádár, the leader of Hungary, initiated a couple of reforms similar to Alexei Kosygin's 1965 economic reform. The reform measures, named the New Economic Mechanism, were introduced in Hungary during Khrushchev's leadership, and were protected by Kosygin in the post-Khrushchev era. Polish leader Władysław Gomułka, who was removed from all of his posts in 1970, was succeeded by Edward Gierek who tried to revitalize the economy of Poland by borrowing money from the First World. The Soviet leadership approved both countries' respective economic experiments, since it was trying to reduce its large Eastern Bloc subsidy program in the form of cheap oil and gas exports.

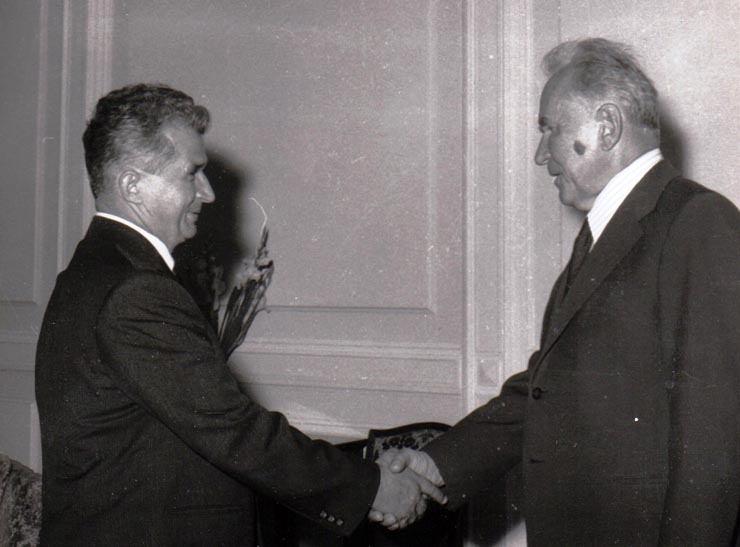
Alexei Kosygin (right) shaking hands with Romanian communist leader Nicolae Ceauşescu on 22 August 1974. Ceauşescu was one of the communist leaders who opposed the 1968 Brezhnev Doctrine.

Not all reforms were supported by the Soviet leadership, however. Alexander Dubček's political and economic liberalisation in the Czechoslovak Socialist Republic led to a Soviet-led invasion of the country by Warsaw Pact countries in August 1968. Not all in the Soviet leadership were as enthusiastic for a military intervention; Brezhnev remained wary of any sort of intervention and Kosygin reminded leaders of the consequences of the Soviet suppression of the 1956 Hungarian revolution. In the aftermath of the invasion the Brezhnev Doctrine was introduced; it stated that the Soviet Union had the right to intervene in any socialist country on the road to communism which was deviating from the communist norm of development. The doctrine was condemned by Romania, Albania and Yugoslavia. As a result, the worldwide communist movement became poly-centric, meaning that the Soviet Union lost its role as 'leader' of the world communist movement. In the aftermath of the invasion, Brezhnev reiterated this doctrine in a speech at the Fifth Congress of the Polish United Workers' Party (PUWP) on 13 November 1968:

When forces that are hostile to socialism try to turn the development of some socialist country towards capitalism, it becomes not only a problem of the country concerned, but a common problem and concern of all socialist countries.

— Brezhnev, Speech to the Fifth Congress of the Polish United Workers' Party in November 1968

On 25 August 1980 the Soviet Politburo established a commission chaired by Mikhail Suslov to examine the political crisis in Poland that was beginning to gain speed. The importance of the commission was demonstrated by its composition: Dmitriy Ustinov (Minister of Defence), Andrei Gromyko (Minister of Foreign Affairs), Yuri Andropov (KGB Chairman) and Konstantin Chernenko, the Head of the General Department of the Central Committee and Brezhnev's closest associate. After just three days, the commission proposed the possibility of a Soviet military intervention, among other concrete measures. Troops and tank divisions were moved to the Soviet–Polish border. Later, however, the Soviet leadership came to the conclusion that they should not intervene in Poland. Stanisław Kania, the First Secretary of the PUWP, mooted the Soviet proposal for introducing martial law in Poland. Erich Honecker, the First Secretary of the East German Socialist Unity Party, supported the decision of the Soviet leadership, and sent a letter to Brezhnev and called for a meeting of the Eastern Bloc leaders to discuss the situation in Poland. When the leaders met at the Kremlin later that year, Brezhnev had concluded that it would be better to leave the domestic matters of Poland alone for the time being, reassuring the Polish delegation, headed by Kania, that the USSR would intervene only if asked to.

As Archie Brown notes in his book The Rise and Fall of Communism, "Poland was a special case". The Soviet Union had intervened in the Democratic Republic of Afghanistan the previous year, and the increasingly hard-line policies of the Reagan administration along with the vast organisational network of the opposition, were among the major reasons why the Politburo Commission pushed for martial law instead of an intervention. When Wojciech Jaruzelski became Prime Minister of Poland in February 1980, the Soviet leadership, but also Poles in general, supported his appointment. As time went by, however, Jaruzelski tried, and failed, according to Archie Brown, "to walk a tightrope" between the demands made by the USSR and the Poles. Martial law was initiated on 13 December 1981 by the Jaruzelski Government.

During the final years of Brezhnev's leadership, and in the aftermath of his death, the Soviet leadership was forced by domestic difficulties to allow the Eastern Bloc governments to introduce more nationalistic communist policies to head off similar unrest to the turmoil in Poland and hence preventing it spreading to other communist countries. In a similar vein, Yuri Andropov, Brezhnev's successor, claimed in a report to the Politburo that maintaining good relations with the Eastern Bloc "took precedence in Soviet foreign policy".

=== Third World ===
You see, even in the jungles they want to live in Lenin's way!

— Leonid Brezhnev, the General Secretary of the Soviet Communist Party, in a close-knit discussion with his Politburo colleagues.

All self-proclaimed African socialist states and the Middle Eastern country of South Yemen were labelled by Soviet ideologists as "States of Socialist Orientation". Numerous African leaders were influenced by Marxism, and even Leninism. Several Soviet think tanks were opposed to the Soviet leadership's policy towards Third World self-proclaimed socialist states, claiming that none of them had built a strong enough capitalist base of development as to be labelled as any kind of socialist. According to historian Archie Brown, these Soviet ideologists were correct, and, as a result no true socialist states were ever established in Africa, though Mozambique certainly came close.

When the Ba'ath Party nationalised the Iraq Petroleum Company, the Iraqi Government sent Saddam Hussein, the Vice President of Iraq, to negotiate a trade agreement with the Soviet Union to soften the anticipated loss of revenue. When Hussein visited the Soviet Union, he managed to get a trade agreement and a treaty of friendship. When Kosygin visited Iraq in 1972, he and Ahmed Hassan al-Bakr, the President of Iraq signed and ratified the Iraqi–Soviet Treaty of Friendship and Co-operation. The alliance also forced the Iraqi Ba'athist government to temporarily stop their prosecution of the Iraqi Communist Party (ICP). The ICP was even given two ministerships following the establishment of an alliance between the Soviet Union and Iraq. The following year, in 1973, al-Bakr went on a state visit to the Soviet Union, and met Brezhnev personally. Relations between the two countries only soured in 1976 when the Iraq Ba'athist regime started a mass campaign against the ICP and other communists. Despite pleas from Brezhnev for clemency, several Iraqi communists were executed publicly.

After the Angolan War of Independence of 1975, the Soviet Union's role in Third World politics increased dramatically. Some of the regions were important for national security, while other regions were important to the expansion of Soviet socialism to other countries. According to an anonymous Soviet writer, the national liberation struggle was the cornerstone of Soviet ideology, and therefore became a cornerstone for Soviet diplomatic activity in the Third World.

Soviet influence in Latin America increased after Cuba became a communist state in 1961. The Cuban revolution was welcomed by Moscow since for once, they could point to a communist government established by indigenous forces instead of the Red Army. Cuba also became the Soviet Union's "front man" for promoting socialism in the Third World as the Havana regime was seen as more marketable and charismatic. By the late 1970s, Soviet influence in Latin America had reached crisis proportions according to several United States Congressmen. Diplomatic and economic ties were established with several countries during the 1970s, and one of them, Peru bought external goods from the Soviet Union. Mexico, and several countries in the Caribbean, forged increasingly strong ties with Comecon, an Eastern Bloc trading organisation established in 1949. The Soviet Union also strengthened its ties with the communist parties of Latin America. Soviet ideologists saw the increasing Soviet presence as a part of the "mounting anti-imperialist struggle for democracy and social justice".

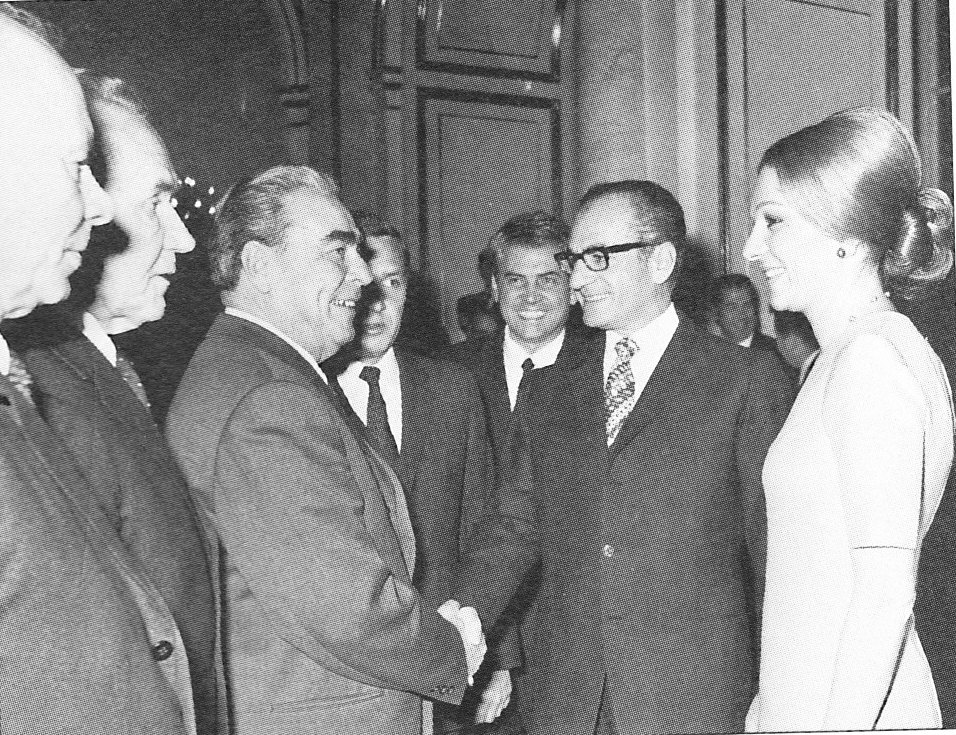
Iranian Emperor Mohammad Reza Pahlavi and Empress Farah Pahlavi meeting with Brezhnev in Moscow, 1970.

The Soviet Union also played a key role in the secessionist struggle against the Portuguese Empire and the struggle for black majority governance in Southern Africa. Control of Somalia was of great interest to both the Soviet Union and the United States, due to the country's strategic location at the mouth of the Red Sea. After the Soviets broke foreign relations with Siad Barre's regime in Somalia, the Soviets turned to the Derg Government in Ethiopia and supported them in their war against Somalia. Because the Soviets changed their allegiance, Barre expelled all Soviet advisers, tore up his friendship treaty with the Soviet Union, and switched allegiance to the West. The United States took the Soviet Union's place in the 1980s in the aftermath of Somalia's loss in the Ogaden War.

In Southeast Asia, Nikita Khrushchev had initially supported North Vietnam out of "fraternal solidarity", but as the war escalated he urged the North Vietnamese leadership to give up the quest of liberating South Vietnam. He continued to reject offers to assist the North Vietnamese government, and instead told them to enter negotiations in the United Nations Security Council. Brezhnev, after taking power, started once again to aid the communist resistance in Vietnam. In February 1965, Kosygin traveled to Hanoi with dozens of Soviet air force generals and economic experts. During the Soviet visit, President Lyndon B. Johnson had allowed US bombing raids on North Vietnamese soil in retaliation of the recent Pleiku airbase attack by the Viet Cong. In post-war Vietnam, Soviet aid became the cornerstone of socio-economic activity. For example, in the early 1980s, 20–30% of the rice eaten by the Vietnamese people was supplied by the Soviet Union. Since Vietnam never developed an arms industry during the Cold War, it was the Soviet Union who assisted them with weapons and material during the Sino-Vietnamese War.

The Soviet Union supported the Vietnamese in their 1978 invasion of Cambodia, an invasion considered by the First World, most notably the United States, and the People's Republic of China to be under the direct command of the Soviet Union. The USSR also became the largest backer of the new puppet state in Cambodia, the People's Republic of Kampuchea (PRK). In a 1979 summit Jimmy Carter complained to Brezhnev about the presence of Vietnamese troops in Cambodia, to which Brezhnev replied that the citizens of the PRK were delighted about the overthrow of the Khmer Rouge-led government; in this, as historian Archie Brown notes, he was right.

=== Afghanistan ===
We should tell Taraki and Amin to change their tactics. They still continue to execute those people who disagree with them. They are killing nearly all of the Parcham leaders, not only the highest rank, but of the middle rank, too.

— Alexei Kosygin, Chairman of the Council of Ministers.

Although the government of Democratic Republic of Afghanistan, formed in the aftermath of the Saur Revolution of 1978, pursued several socialist policies, the country was "never considered socialist by the Soviet Union", according to historian Archie Brown. Indeed, since the USSR had backed the previous regime under Mohammed Daoud Khan, the revolution, which had surprised the Soviet leadership, created many difficulties for the Soviet Union. The People's Democratic Party of Afghanistan, the Afghan communist party, consisted of two opposing factions, the khalqs and the parchams; the Soviet leadership supported the latter, which had also joined Moscow in backing the previous Daoud regime. After engineering the coup, however it was the Khalq faction that took over the reins of power. Nur Muhammad Taraki became both President and Prime Minister of Afghanistan, while Hafizullah Amin became the Deputy Prime Minister of Afghanistan, and, from May 1979, Prime Minister. The new Khalq government ordered the execution of several high-standing and low-standing members of the Parcham faction. To make matters even worse, Taraki's and Hafizullah's relationship with each other soon turned sour as opposition against their government increased. On 20 March 1979 Taraki travelled to the Soviet Union and met with Premier Kosygin, Dmitriy Ustinov (Defence Minister), Andrei Gromyko (Foreign Minister) and Boris Ponomarev (head of the International Department of the Central Committee), to discuss the possibilities of a Soviet intervention in Afghanistan. Kosygin opposed the idea, believing that the Afghan leadership had to prove it had the support of the people by combating opposition on its own, though he did agree to increase material aid to Afghanistan. When Taraki asked Kosygin about the possibilities of a military intervention led by the Eastern Bloc Kosygin rebuked him once more, again telling him that the Afghan leadership had to survive on its own. However, in a closed meeting without Kosygin, the Politburo unanimously supported a Soviet intervention.

In late 1979 Taraki failed to assassinate Amin, who, in a revenge attack, successfully engineered Taraki's own assassination on 9 October. Later, in December, the Soviet Union invaded Afghanistan at the behest of Khan. On 27 December a KGB unit killed Amin. Babrak Karmal, the leader of the Parcham faction, was chosen by the Soviet leadership as Amin's successor in the aftermath of the Soviet intervention. Unfortunately for the Soviet leadership Karmal did not turn out to be the leader they expected, and he, just as his predecessors had arrested and killed several Parcham-members, arrested and killed several high-standing and low-standing Khalq members simply because they supported the wrong faction. With Soviet troops still in the country, however, he was forced to bow to Soviet pressure, and released all Khalq prisoners. To make matters even worse for Karmal several of the previously arrested Khalq-members were forced to join the new government. At the time of Brezhnev's death, the Soviet Union was still bogged down in Afghanistan.

== Dissident movement ==
Soviet dissidents and human rights groups were routinely repressed by the KGB. Overall, political repression tightened during the Brezhnev era and Stalin experienced a partial rehabilitation. The two leading figures in the Soviet dissident movement during the Brezhnev Era were Aleksandr Solzhenitsyn and Andrei Sakharov. Despite their individual fame and widespread sympathy in the West, they attracted little support from the mass of the population. Sakharov was forced into internal exile in 1979, and Solzhenitsyn was forced out of the country in 1974.

As a result, many dissidents became members of the Communist Party instead of protesting actively against the Soviet system throughout the 1970s and 1980s. These dissidents were defined by Archie Brown as "gradualists" who wanted to change the way the system worked in a slow manner. The International Department of the Central Committee and the Socialist Countries Department of the Central Committee – departments considered by the First World media to be filled with conservative communists – were in fact the departments where Mikhail Gorbachev, as Soviet leader, would draw most of his "new thinkers" from. These officials had been influenced by Western culture and ideals by their travelling and reading. Reformers were also in much greater numbers in the country's research institutes.

The Brezhnev-era Soviet regime became notorious for using psychiatry as a means of silencing dissent. Many intellectuals, religious figures, and sometimes commoners protesting their low standard of living were ruled to be clinically insane and confined to mental hospitals.

Dissident success was mixed. Jews wanting to emigrate from the Soviet Union in the 1970s formed the most successful, and most organised, dissident movement. Their success can be attributed to the movement's support abroad, most notably from the Jewish community in the United States. In addition, as a group they were not advocating a transformation of Soviet society; the Jewish dissident movement was simply interested in leaving the Soviet Union for Israel. The Soviet Government subsequently sought to improve diplomatic ties with the First World by allowing the Jews to emigrate. The emigration flow was reduced dramatically as Soviet–American tension increased in the later half of the 1970s, though it was revived somewhat in 1979, peaking at 50,000. In the early 1980s, however, the Soviet leadership decided to block emigration completely. Despite official claims that antisemitism was a bourgeois ideology incompatible with socialism, the truth was that Jews who openly practiced their religion or identified as Jewish from a cultural standpoint faced widespread discrimination from the Soviet system.

In 1978, a dissident movement of a different kind emerged when a group of unemployed miners led by Vladimir Klebanov attempted to form a labor union and demand collective bargaining. The main groups of Soviet dissidents, consisting mostly of intellectuals, remained aloof, and Klebanov was soon confined to a mental institution. Another attempt a month later to form a union of white collar professionals was also quickly broken up by authorities and its founder Vladimir Svirsky arrested.

Every time when we speak about Solzhenitsyn as the enemy of the Soviet regime, this just happens to coincide with some important [international] events and we postpone the decision.

— Andrei Kirilenko, a Politburo member.

In general, the dissident movement had spurts of activity, including during the Warsaw Pact invasion of Czechoslovakia, when several people demonstrated at Red Square in Moscow. With safety in numbers, dissidents who were interested in democratic reform were able to show themselves, though the demonstration, and the short-lived organised dissident group, were eventually repressed by the Soviet Government. The movement was then renewed once again with the Soviet signing of the Helsinki Accords. Several Helsinki Watch Groups were established across the country, all of which were routinely repressed, and many closed down. Due to the strong position of the Soviet Government, many dissidents had problems reaching a "wide audience", and by the early 1980s, the Soviet dissident movement was in disarray: the country's most notable dissidents had been exiled, either internally or externally, sent to prison or deported to the Gulags.

The anti-religious course pursued by Khrushchev was toned down by the Brezhnev/Kosygin leadership, with most Orthodox churches being staffed by docile clergy often tied to the KGB. State propaganda tended to focus more on promoting "scientific atheism" rather than active persecution of believers. Nonetheless, minority faiths continued to be harassed relentlessly by the authorities, and particularly troubling to them was the continued resilience of Islam in the Central Asian republics. This was worsened by their geographical proximity to Iran, which fell under control of a fanatical Islamic government in 1979 that professed hostility to both the United States and the Soviet Union. While official figures put the number of believers at 9–10% of the population, authorities were nonetheless baffled at the continued widespread presence of religious belief in society, especially since by the start of the 1980s, the vast majority of Soviet citizens alive had no memory of tsarist times.

== Soviet society ==
=== Ideology and beliefs ===
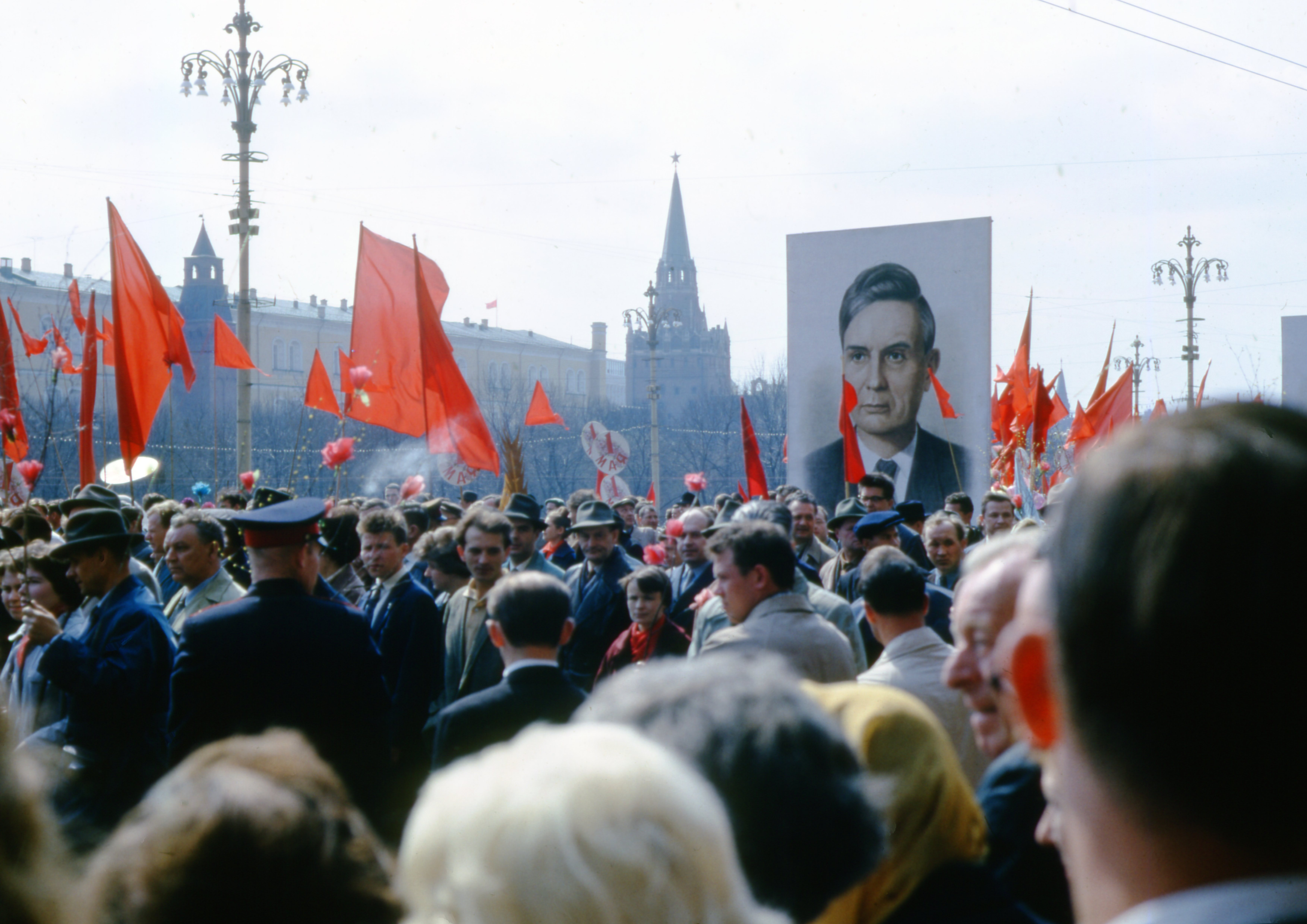
May Day parade in Moscow. Participants carry the portrait of Mikhail Suslov – chief ideologist of the Soviet Union

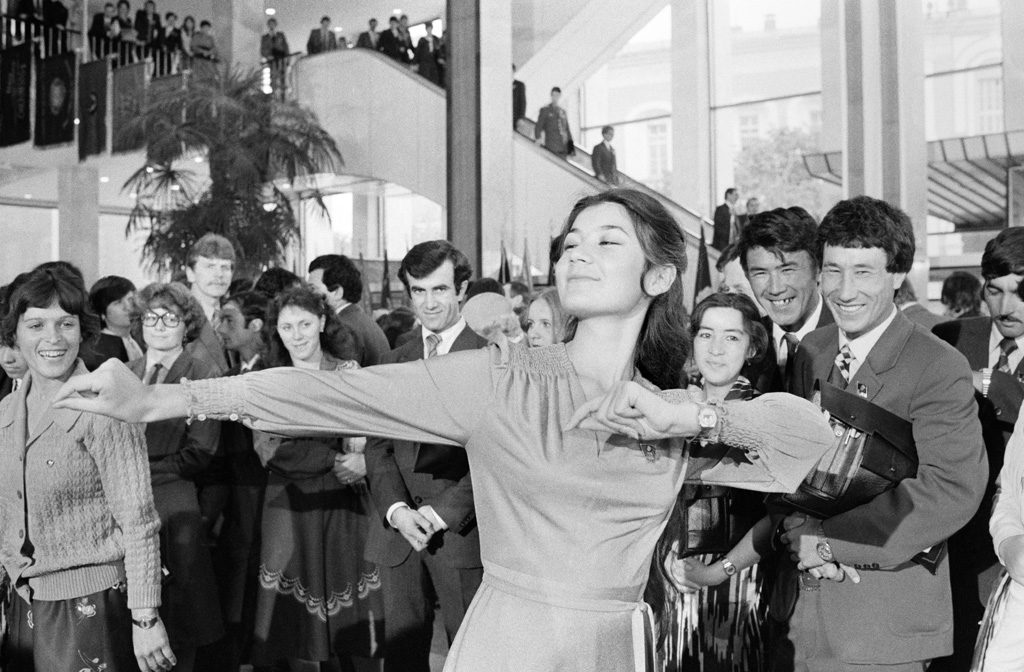
Dancing during a break between sessions of the 19th Komsomol Congress (photo taken in May 1982)

Soviet society is generally regarded as having reached maturity under Brezhnev's leadership. Edwin Bacon and Mark Sandle in their 2002 book Brezhnev Reconsidered noted that "a social revolution" took place in the Soviet Union during his 18-year-long ascendancy. The increasingly modernized Soviet society was becoming more urban, and people became better educated and more professionalized. In contrast to previous periods dominated by "terrors, cataclysms and conflicts", the Brezhnev era constituted a period of continuous development without interruption. There was a fourfold growth in higher education between the 1950s and 1980s; official discourse referred to this development as the "scientific-technological revolution". In addition, women came to make up half of the country's educated specialists.

Following Khrushchev's controversial 1961 claim that (pure) communism could be reached "within 20 years", the new Soviet leadership responded by fostering the concept of "developed socialism". Brezhnev declared the onset of the era of developed socialism in 1971 at the 24th Congress of the Communist Party of the Soviet Union. Developed socialism was described as socialism "attaining developed conditions", the result of "perfecting" the socialist society which the Bolsheviks had created. In short, developed socialism would be just another stage in the development of communism. Developed socialism evolved into the Brezhnev regime's ideological cornerstone – the concept helped the regime to explain the situation of the Soviet Union. However, the theory of developed socialism also held that the Soviet Union had reached a state in development where it was crisis-free, and this proved incorrect. As a result, Yuri Andropov, Brezhnev's successor, initiated the de-Brezhnevisation of the Soviet Union during his short time in office (1982–1984), and introduced more realistic ideological theses. He did retain "developed socialism" as a part of the state ideology, however.

=== Culture ===
During the Brezhnev era, pressure from below forced the Soviet leadership to alter some cultural policies, though the fundamental characteristics of the Communist system remained. Rock music and jeans, formerly criticized as hallmarks of Western culture, became tolerated. The Soviet Union even started to manufacture its own jeans in the 1970s. As time progressed, however, Soviet youth became more eager to buy Western products. The Soviet black market flourished during the Brezhnev era, and "fake Western jeans" became very popular, according to Archie Brown. Western rock-groups such as The Beatles remained very popular throughout the Soviet Union and the Eastern Bloc, even if Soviet official policy remained wary of them. Soviet rock music evolved, and became a form of dissidence against the Soviet system. Vladimir Vysotsky, Alexander Galich and Bulat Okudzhava became the most renowned rock-musicians, and their lyrics, and music in general, were critical of the country's Stalinist past, as well as of its undemocratic system. In a 1981 editorial published in Pravda, Viktor Chebrikov, then a deputy KGB head, commented on the apathy of Soviet youth towards the system and accused the West of using concepts such as consumerism, religion, and nationalism to encourage "pessimism, nihilism, and the pervasive view that life is better in the West." He also argued that foreign groups of Estonians, Latvians, and other ethnicities had a considerable influence on Soviet society.

=== Standard of living ===
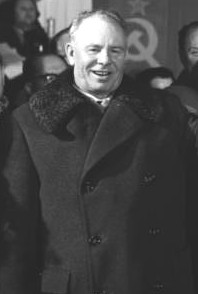
The official explanation for the ousting of Nikolai Podgorny, the head of state from 1965 to 1977, cited his stance against détente and increasing the supply of consumer goods.

From 1964 to 1973, the Soviet GDP per head (as expressed in US dollars) increased. Over the eighteen years Brezhnev led the Soviet Union, average income per head increased by half in equivalent US dollars. In the first half of the Brezhnev period, income per head increased by 3.5 percent per annum, though this represented slightly less growth than in the last years of Khrushchev. This can be explained by the reversion of most of Khrushchev's policies when Brezhnev came to power. Over time, however, citizens did find themselves better off than under Khrushchev. Consumption per head rose by an estimated 70% under Brezhnev, though three-quarters of this growth happened before 1973 and only one-quarter in the second half of his time in office. Most of the increase in consumer production in the early Brezhnev era can be attributed to the 1965 Kosygin reform, according to an analysis on the performance of the reform carried out by the Moscow State University.

When the USSR's economic growth stalled in the 1970s, government focus shifted onto improving the standard of living and housing quality. The standard of living in Russia had fallen behind that of Georgia and Estonia under Brezhnev; this led many Russians to see the policies of the Soviet Government as hurting the Russian population. To regain support, instead of paying more attention to the stagnant economy, the Soviet leadership under Brezhnev extended social benefits to boost the standard of living. This did indeed lead to an increase, albeit a minor one, in public support for the regime.

In terms of advanced technology, the Soviet Union lagged far behind the United States, Western Europe, and Japan. Vacuum-tube electronics remained in use in the USSR long after they became obsolete elsewhere, and many factories in the 1980s still used 1930s-vintage machine tools. In an interview with an American journalist in 1982, General Nikolai Ogarkov admitted that "in America, even small children play with computers. We do not even have them in all the offices of the Defense Ministry. And for reasons you well know, we cannot make computers widely available in our society." Soviet manufacturing was not only primitive by Western standards, but extremely inefficient, often requiring 2 to 3 times the labor force of a mill or factory in the US.

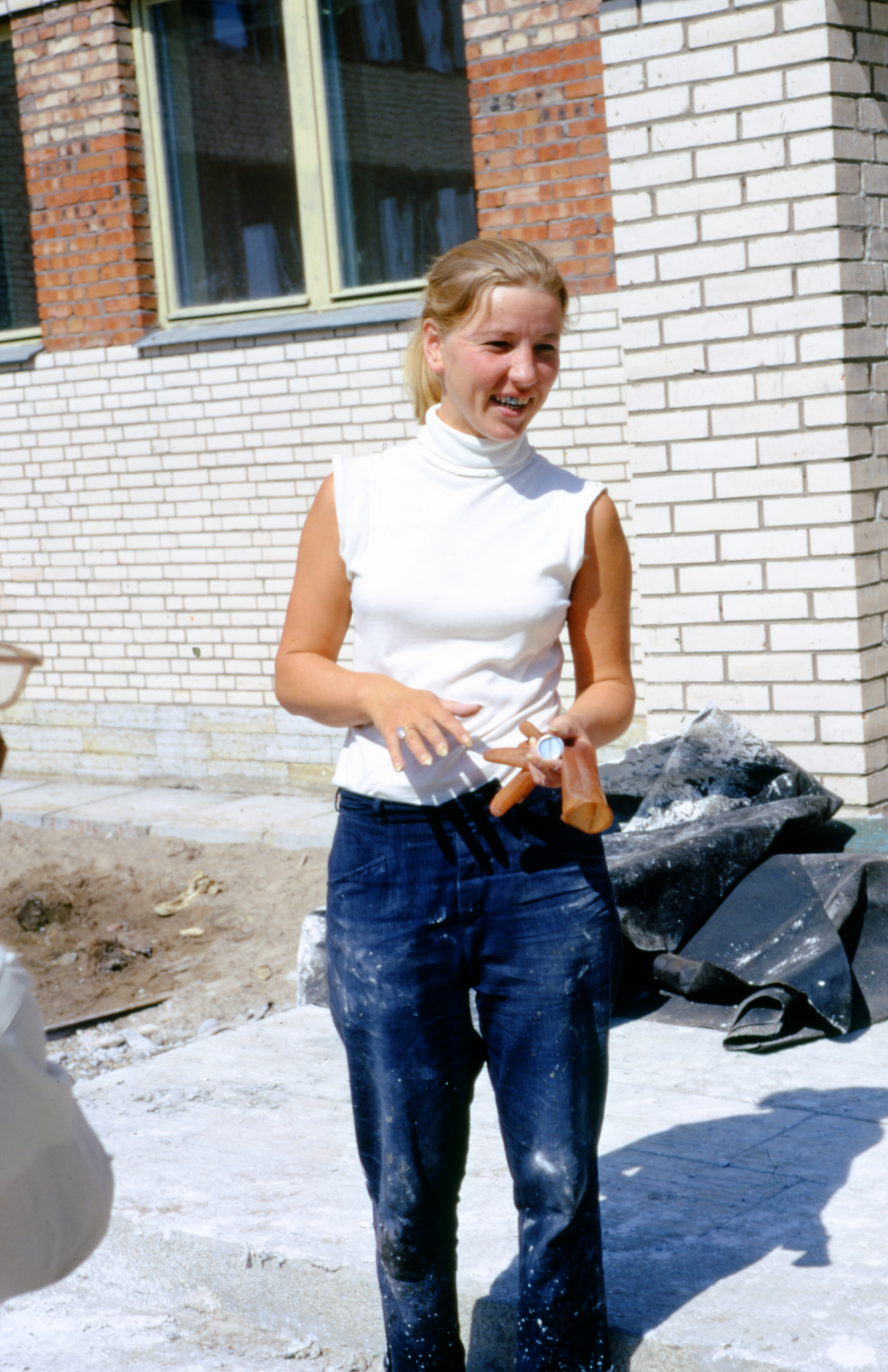
Soviet female construction worker in 1975

The Brezhnev era saw material improvements for the Soviet citizen, but the Politburo received no credit for this; the average Soviet citizen took for granted the material improvements in the 1970s, i.e. the cheap provision of consumer goods, food, shelter, clothing, sanitation, health care, and transport. The common citizen associated Brezhnev's leadership more with its limitations than with its actual progress: as a result, Brezhnev earned neither affection nor respect. Most Soviet citizens had no power to change the existing system, so most of them tried to make the best of a bad situation. Rates of alcoholism, mental illness, divorce, and suicide rose inexorably during the Brezhnev era. Among ethnic Russians, the divorce rate by the late 1970s was alarmingly high, and 1 in 4 adults lived alone. Women experienced particular difficulties, as they performed the majority of the shopping, which could involve waiting in line for hours. Birthrates by 1982 had nearly flatlined; Muslims in the Central Asian republics were the only group in the USSR with above-replacement fertility.

While investments in consumer goods remained below projections, the expansion in output increased the Soviet people's standard of living. Refrigerators, owned by only 32 percent of the population in the early 1970s, had reached 86% of households by the late 1980s, and the ownership of color televisions increased from 51% in the early 1970s to 74% in the 1980s. On the other hand, though some areas improved during the Brezhnev era, the majority of civilian services deteriorated, with the physical environment for the common Soviet citizen falling apart rapidly. Disease increased because of the decaying health-care system, and living space remained rather small by First World standards, with the common Soviet citizen living in 13.4 square metres (144 sq ft). At the same time thousands of Moscow inhabitants were homeless, most of them living in shacks, doorways, and parked trams. Authorities often conducted sweeps of movie theaters, restaurants, and saunas to locate people avoiding work, particularly during major events like the 1980 Summer Olympics that attracted large numbers of foreign visitors. Nutrition ceased to improve in the late 1970s, with rationing of staple food-products returning to locales such as Sverdlovsk. Environmental damage and pollution became a growing problem due to the Soviet government's policy of development at all costs, and some parts of the country, such as the Kazakh SSR, suffered particularly badly with their use as testing grounds for nuclear weapons. While Soviet citizens in 1962 had enjoyed higher average life-expectancy than people in the United States, by 1982 it had fallen by nearly five years.

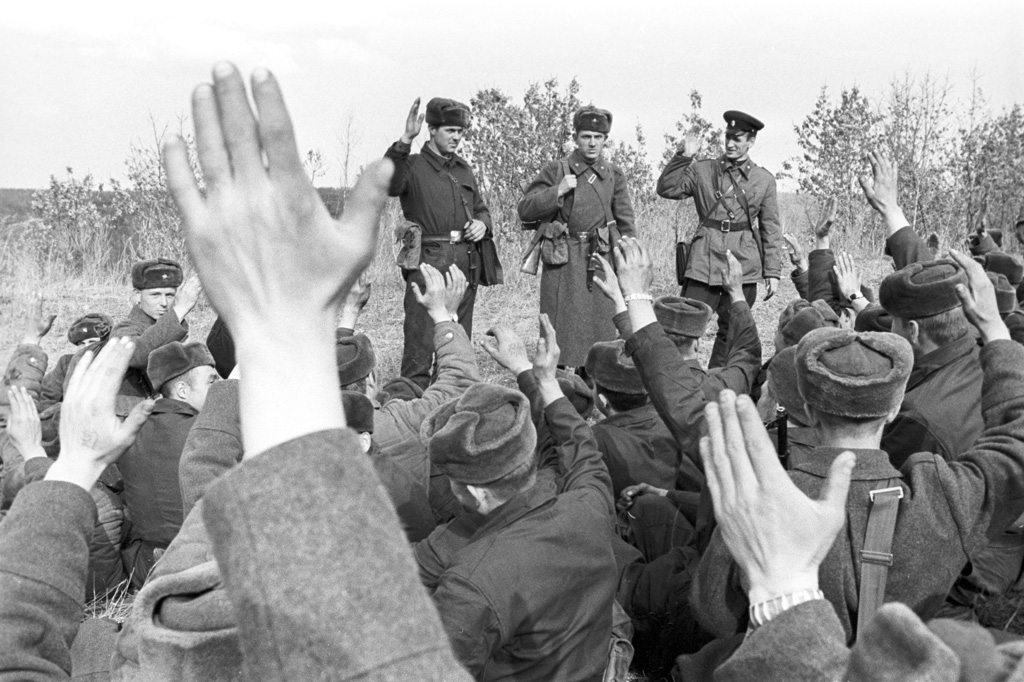
Private Nikolai Zaitsev being unanimously inducted into the Komsomol during a border guards' military drill in the Soviet Far East (photo taken in 1969).

These effects were not felt uniformly, however. For example, by the end of the Brezhnev era, blue-collar workers had higher wages than professional workers in the Soviet Union – the wage of a secondary-school teacher in the Soviet Union was only 150 rubles while a bus driver earned 230. As a whole, real wages increased from 96.5 rubles a month in 1965 to 190.1 rubles a month in 1985. A small minority benefited even more substantially. The state provided daily recreation and annual holidays for hard-working citizens. Soviet trade unions rewarded hard-working members and their families with beach vacations in Crimea and Georgia. Workers who fulfilled the monthly production quota set by the Soviet government were honored by placing their respective names on the factory's Roll of Honor. The state awarded badges for all manner of public services, and war veterans were allowed to go to the head of shop queues. All members of the USSR Academy of Sciences were given a special badge and their own chauffeur-driven car. These awards, perks and privileges made it easier for some to find decent job placements, though they did not prevent the degeneration of Soviet society. Urbanization had led to unemployment in the Soviet agricultural sector, with most of the able workforce leaving villages for the local towns.

Overall, one could say that women had made marked social progress since the 1917 Bolshevik Revolution; by the Brezhnev era they comprised a considerable number of sole breadwinners in the USSR. Some professions (such as those in the medical field) had a considerable female workforce, although most of the best jobs (including academics, the state bureaucracy, and the military) remained almost exclusively the domain of men.

The agricultural sector continued to perform poorly. By Brezhnev's final year food shortages were reaching disturbing levels of frequency. Particularly embarrassing to the regime was the fact that even bread had become rationed, one commodity that they always prided themselves on being available. One reason for this was excessive consumer demand as food prices remained artificially low while incomes had trebled over the last 20 years. Despite the failure of collective farming which resulted in mass starvation and peasant apathy, the Soviet government remained committed to reducing imports of foodstuffs from the West, even though they cost less than domestic production – not only for reasons of national pride, but out of fear of becoming dependent on capitalist countries for basic necessities.

Social "rigidification" became a common feature in Soviet society. During the Stalin era in the 1930s and 1940s, common laborers could expect promotion to a white-collar job if they studied and obeyed Soviet authorities. In Brezhnev's Soviet Union this was not the case. Holders of attractive offices clung to them as long as possible; mere incompetence was not seen as a good reason to dismiss anyone. In this way, in addition to the others previously mentioned, the Soviet society Brezhnev left to his successors had become "static".

== Historical assessments ==
Despite Brezhnev's failures in domestic reforms, his foreign affairs and defense policies turned the Soviet Union into a superpower. His popularity among citizens lessened during his last years, and support for the ideals of communism and Marxism-Leninism waned, even if the majority of Soviet citizens remained wary of liberal democracy and multi-party systems in general.

The political corruption which had grown considerably during Brezhnev's tenure had become a major problem to the Soviet Union's economic development by the 1980s. In response, Andropov initiated a nationwide anti-corruption campaign. Andropov believed that the Soviet economy could possibly recover if the government were able to increase social discipline amongst workers. Brezhnev was seen as very vain and self-obsessed, but was praised for leading the Soviet Union into an unprecedented age of stability and domestic calm.

Following Andropov's death, political wrangling led to harsh criticism of Brezhnev and his family. Mikhail Gorbachev, the last Soviet leader, drew support from hard-line communists and the Soviet population by criticizing Brezhnev's leadership, and referred to his period as the leader as the "Era of Stagnation". Despite these attacks, in a poll taken in 2006, 61 percent of the people responded that they viewed the Brezhnev era as good for Russia.
