= Agricultural commune =

Intentional community based on agricultural labor

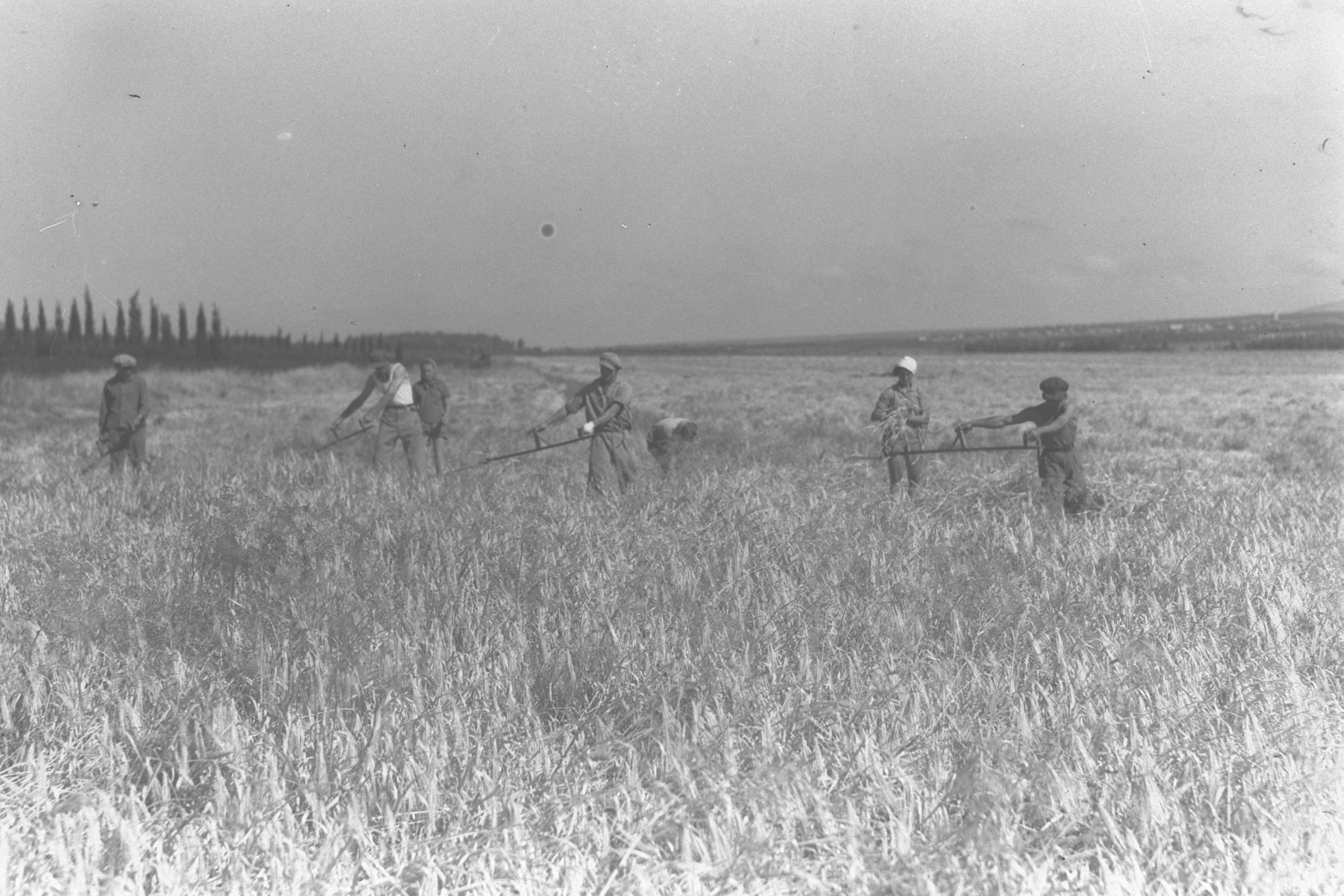
Kibbutz members harvesting grain at Ein Harod

An agricultural commune is a commune based on agricultural labor. It is usually differentiated from other forms of collective agriculture by near-complete collective ownership of capital assets and collective consumption of the products of agriculture.

== Karl Marx ==
In his 1881 letter to Vera Zasulich, Karl Marx wrote that historically the obshchina, the traditional Russian "agricultural commune" was the most recent type of archaic forms of societies. Marx wrote that the following features distinguish the agricultural commune from more archaic forms of commune.

- Older communes were based on kinship
- In an agricultural commune, the house and yard were private property
- In an agricultural commune, the arable land was common but was periodically divided among members to till and to own crops from it, while in archaic communes production was carried out communally and the yield was shared out.

Marx regarded the ideal agricultural commune as utopian and not practical in the society of his time or the foreseeable future.

== Agricultural communes in the Soviet Union ==
The "agricultural commune" or "agricommune" (Russian: Сельскохозяйственная коммуна, сельхозкоммуна) was a form of agricultural cooperation in the early Soviet Union. They began to form spontaneously following the 1917 revolution but had their roots in much older Russian traditions of communal life in agricultural settings. The agricultural communes of the 1920s were often religious in nature, either explicitly (as was common in the North Caucasus) or strongly influenced by non-conformist and sectarian religion.

The commune was the most collectivist of the agricultural structures to appear following the revolution. In agricultural communes, land and tools were communal property and the product was distributed per capita ("per mouth"). Often, the commune would house and feed its members, sometimes caring for their children communally. The commune typically had near-complete collective ownership of its capital assets, compared to other collective organisations operating at the time.

Revolutionary intellectuals had often favoured the formation of agricultural communes around the time of the revolution, seeing them as the embodiment of the rural ideal, but the Bolsheviks (who were initially not strictly opposed to private ownership and later were more concerned with solidifying State control and supporting industrialisation) never favoured them. As Soviet thought came to be more strictly controlled by the Bolsheviks, agricultural communes fell from favour. The commune — where collective consumption went alongside collective ownership and production — was also difficult to reconcile with the need to feed a fast-growing urban population as the Soviets pursued rapid industrialisation. With the forced state collectivisation programme beginning in the late 1920s, the agricultural communes were transformed into kolkhozes, collective on paper but in practice having many of the characteristics of state-owned enterprises.

== Agricultural communes in non-Soviet societies ==
Agricultural communes have been formed in many societies. The reasons for their formation vary with the time and place and include the pursuit of religious ideals, utopianism and practical necessity. Many were formed in the USA in the 19th century, with some of these surviving into the 1960s; the kibbutzim of modern Israel are also based in agricultural communism, though many have since diversified away from agriculture.
