= Collective consumption =

Collective consumption refers to goods and services that are produced and consumed on a public, shared, or collective level. The concept provides an alternative to viewing consumption as a purely individual or private activity. Examples of collective consumption include public transportation, public housing, libraries, schools, health care, waste disposal, parks, and police and fire protection.

The term is closely related to the economic concept of public goods — non-rivalrous goods or services that are essential to consumers but which the private market is unlikely to supply, thus requiring government provision. The collective consumption is not limited to public goods, though: quite a few goods consumed collectively are rivalrous, like a hospital bed, a school desk, an apartment in a public housing complex (this subclass of private goods that are nonetheless consumed collectively is sometimes called merit goods). Some services, like national defense, could not be sensibly provided by the market, while others, like education or housing, could be and often are. The degree to which a society's consumption is collective is sometimes used as a traditional index of its socialist policies, and the concept is also referred to as socialized consumption.

== Manuel Castells and urban sociology ==
The link between collective consumption and government provision was a central element of the neo-Marxist approach of urban sociologist Manuel Castells in the 1970s. Castells sought to explain the location of the boundary between private and public consumption in Western capitalist societies.

Castells argued that the state was forced to intervene in providing goods and services "whose organisation and management cannot be other than collective" due to their size and complexity. Because these services are typically located in urban areas, Castells used collective consumption to define the nature of the city itself, describing it as a "unit of collective consumption" that supports the daily organization and "reproduction of labour power" (e.g., providing public transport for workers to get to their jobs).

In Castells's view, these shared consumption processes create common experiences that lead to political action. He theorized that while the state must provide these goods, it is often unable to meet their cost, leading to a "tendency toward crisis" that precipitates urban social movements.

== Criticism and decline ==
Sociologist Ray Pahl criticized Castells's neo-Marxist approach. Pahl argued that collective consumption was not a distinctive feature of monopoly capitalism, as it is an equally significant feature of socialist societies. He also found the term "misleading," noting that the services (such as public transport) are significant because they contribute to economic production — by enabling the "reproduction of labor power" — rather than just consumption.

Partly as a consequence of these criticisms, the urban sociology approach to collective consumption "tended to die away in the 1990s" and was largely absorbed into the more general sociology of consumption.

== Ambiguities of the concept ==
The concept of collective consumption contains several ambiguities:

- State vs. Market: It is not always clear if the term refers to goods the market is unable to provide, or simply unwilling to provide (e.g., due to low profitability).
- State vs. Voluntary Sector: Not all collective consumption involves the state. Voluntary associations and charitable organizations often provide services (like social work or housing) that bypass the market but also operate independently of government.
- Intrinsic Nature: No good is intrinsically "private" or "collective." Its categorization depends on variables such as current technology and market conditions.
- Privatization: The "New Right" program of privatization has blurred the lines. The "nominal transfer" of services like transport or health to the market often involves continued "extensive state regulation and control," including subsidies, and a requirement to provide some public service.

== Collective provision vs. collective use ==
A central and unresolved difficulty in the concept is whether it refers to collective *provision* or collective *use*. Many services provided collectively by the community, such as street parking or waste collection, are ultimately consumed by individuals. In contrast, other provisions, such as a "communal festival" or the "audience at a sporting or cultural event," are both provided and consumed collectively by a "collectivity."

Sociologist Colin Campbell suggests it "would seem sensible to restrict the use of the term" to situations where consumption is clearly undertaken by a collectivity, rather than by multiple individuals who are independently consuming the same service.

== Sources ==
- Campbell, Colin (2003). "Collective Consumption". In Levinson, David; Christensen, Karen (eds.). Encyclopedia of Community: From the Village to the Virtual World. SAGE. pp. 203–205. ISBN 978-0-7619-2598-9.
- Castells, Manuel (1977). The Urban Question: A Marxist Approach. Translated by Sheridan, Alan. London: Edward Arnold. ISBN 978-0-7131-5936-3.
- Dunleavy, Patrick (2019-04-15). "Collective Consumption". In Orum, Anthony M. (ed.). The Wiley Blackwell Encyclopedia of Urban and Regional Studies. Wiley. doi:10.1002/9781118568446.eurs0052. ISBN 978-1-118-56845-3.
- Pahl, R. E. (1978). "Castells and collective consumption". Sociology. 12 (2). Sage Publications: 309–315. doi:10.1177/003803857801200206.
