= Advanced technology =

Advanced technology refers, in general, to high technology.

Advanced technology may also refer to:

- Advanced steam technology
- Advanced Technology & Education Park
- Advanced Technology College
- Advanced Technology Engine
- Advanced Technology Development Center
- Advanced Technology Development Facility
- Advanced Technology Large-Aperture Space Telescope
- Advanced Technology Program
