= Socialist society =

Socialist society may refer to one of the following:

- Communist society
- Socialist Society, a periodical
- Socialist society (Labour Party), an organization
