= Sackler =

Sackler is a surname. Notable people with the surname include:

- Arthur M. Sackler, American physician and pharmaceutical entrepreneur
- Elizabeth Sackler, American philanthropist
- Howard Sackler, American playwright (The Great White Hope)
- Joss Sackler, Canadian fashion designer
- Mortimer Sackler, American pharmaceutical entrepreneur, brother to Arthur and Raymond
- Raymond Sackler, American pharmaceutical entrepreneur, brother to Mortimer and Arthur
- Richard Sackler (born 1945), American billionaire businessman, son of Raymond

== See also ==
- Sackler family, American family at the center of the opioid crisis known for founding and owning the pharmaceutical companies Purdue Pharma and Mundipharma
- Sackler Prize for theoretical physics
- Sackler Faculty of Medicine – in Tel Aviv, Israel
- Sackler Library – at Oxford University
