= Painkiller (TV series) =

American TV series

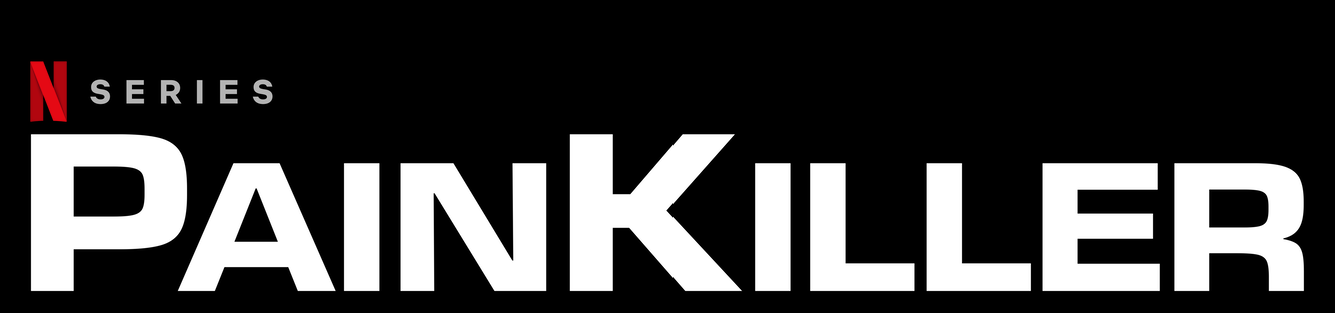
- Created by: Micah Fitzerman-Blue; Noah Harpster
- Based on: Empire of Pain: The Secret History of the Sackler Dynasty by Patrick Radden Keefe; Pain Killer: An Empire of Deceit and the Origin of America's Opioid Epidemic by Barry Meier
- Directed by: Peter Berg
- Starring: Uzo Aduba; Matthew Broderick; Taylor Kitsch; Dina Shihabi; West Duchovny; Carolina Bartczak; Brian Markinson; John Rothman; Tyler Ritter; Sam Anderson; John Ales; Ron Lea; Jack Mulhern; Noah Harpster
- Composer: Matt Morton
- Country of origin: United States
- Original language: English
- No. of episodes: 6

Production
- Executive producers: Micah Fitzerman-Blue; Noah Harpster; Eric Newman; Alex Gibney
- Producer: Chris Hatcher
- Cinematography: Brendan Steacy
- Editors: Geofrey Hildrew; Garret Donnelly
- Production companies: Blue Harp; Film 44; Grand Electric; Jigsaw Productions

Original release
- Network: Netflix
- Release: August 10, 2023

Painkiller is an American drama television miniseries created by Micah Fitzerman-Blue and Noah Harpster. Based on Patrick Radden Keefe's New Yorker article "The Family That Built an Empire of Pain" and Pain Killer: An Empire of Deceit and the Origin of America's Opioid Epidemic by Barry Meier, the series focuses on the birth of the opioid crisis, with an emphasis on Purdue Pharma, the company owned by Richard Sackler and his family. It documents Purdue's aggressive and unethical marketing tactics used to promote their 'blockbuster' drug OxyContin, an extended-release formulation of the opioid oxycodone. The Sackler family has been described as the "most evil family in America", and "the worst drug dealers in history".

Painkiller premiered on Netflix on August 10, 2023.

== Cast and characters ==
- Uzo Aduba as Edie Flowers
- Matthew Broderick as Richard Sackler
- Sam Anderson as Raymond Sackler
- Clark Gregg as Arthur Sackler
- Taylor Kitsch as Glen Kryger
- Carolina Bartczak as Lily Kryger
- Tyler Ritter as John L. Brownlee
- John Ales as Gregory Fitzgibbons
- Ron Lea as Bill Havens
- Ana Cruz Kayne as Brianna Ortiz
- West Duchovny as Shannon Schaeffer
- Jack Mulhern as Tyler Kryger
- Dina Shihabi as Britt
- John Rothman as Mortimer Sackler
- John Murphy as Michael Friedman
- Noah Harpster as Curtis Wright
- Trenna Keating as Deborah Marlowe

== Episodes ==
No.	Title	Directed by	Written by	Original release date
1	"The One to Start With, The One to Stay With"	Peter Berg	Micah Fitzerman-Blue & Noah Harpster	August 10, 2023
A physician prescribes OxyContin to one of his patients, who has unmanageable pain. He informs the patient that the effects of OxyContin last longer than the Vicodin the patient was taking, and as a result, they won't have to take OxyContin as frequently. He also mentions that it causes the same side effects as other opioids, particularly constipation. Richard Sackler is vilified over the prescription of OxyContin to patients who need to manage pain and to drug addicts.
2	"Jesus Gave Me Water"	Peter Berg	Micah Fitzerman-Blue & Noah Harpster	August 10, 2023
Arthur Sackler, Richard's uncle, is accused of wanting to sell OxyContin to as many people as possible to increase profits for his company, Purdue Pharma. Providers offer physicians coupons to distribute the Schedule 2 narcotic. A doctor tells Shannon Schaeffer, a new sales representative, that "Oxycodone, that's what's in OxyContin. Morphine, codeine, hydrocodone, hydromorphone, diacetylmorphine, that's heroin. All come from the opium poppy". Curtis Wright IV drags out approval at the FDA.
3	"Blizzard of the Century"	Peter Berg	Will Hettinger and Micah Fitzerman-Blue & Noah Harpster	August 10, 2023
John L. Brownlee reviews the legal case against Purdue Pharma. Schaeffer's mentor reminds her, "They're drug addicts. They existed long before OxyContin, and they'll exist long after OxyContin". A prisoner reminisces about the 1990s crack epidemic in the United States. OxyContin addicts are becoming unemployed, committing robberies, auto thefts, filing for disability, and so on.
4	"Is Believed"	Peter Berg	Boo Killebrew & Micah Fitzerman-Blue & Noah Harpster	August 10, 2023
After the death of a young woman, Shannon Schaeffer tells a prescribing physician that "She [the woman's mother] can't look at herself and say, 'I messed up. My daughter was a druggie'. She needs to blame someone". Purdue advertisements claim that less than 1% of users develop an addiction to OxyContin, which is contradicted by statistics.
5	"Hot! Hot! Hot!"	Peter Berg	Boo Killebrew & Micah Fitzerman-Blue & Noah Harpster	August 10, 2023
The public and media notice and start applying pressure on Purdue Pharma. Glenn spirals downward with increasing doses of OxyContin, eventually turning to the black market, with dire consequences. Shannon sees deeper into the workings at Purdue and becomes disillusioned. Edie convinces her boss that OxyContin is a public health problem, and together, they come up with a strategy to go after the company.
6	"What's in a Name?"	Peter Berg	Micah Fitzerman-Blue & Noah Harpster	August 10, 2023
Richard Sackler warns the corporate officers of Purdue Pharma that, "They will dismantle everything we've built—brick by brick".

== Production ==
Production began in Toronto in April 2021 and wrapped in November 2021. The series was directed by Peter Berg.

== Reception ==
On review aggregator Rotten Tomatoes, 50% of 54 critics gave the series a positive review, with an average rating of 6.0/10. The website's critics consensus reads, "Painkiller honors the victims of the opioid crisis with effective dramatic beats but is undermined by its stale satirical flourishes, resulting in a tonally confused bit of muckraking." On Metacritic, the series holds a weighted average score of 59 out of 100, based on 26 critics, indicating "mixed or average reviews".

Writing for American Council on Science and Health, a pro-industry advocacy group, Cameron English criticized the series, alleging that it unfairly pins the blame for the opioid crisis on Purdue and the Sackler family.

== See also ==
- Dopesick
- The Crime of the Century
