= Manfred Green =

Israeli epidemiologist

Manfred Green (Hebrew: מנפרד גרין) is an Israeli epidemiologist. He is a full professor in the research track in the School of Public Health at the University of Haifa. He is head of the International Master's in Public Health Program and chairperson of the doctoral committee.

== Early life ==
Manfred Green was born in Johannesburg, South Africa, and emigrated to Israel in 1976. At the University of the Witwatersrand, he earned a B.Sc.(Hons) in Mathematical Statistics. At the University of Cape Town he earned an M.Sc. in Operations Research and a medical degree MBChB. At the University of North Carolina at Chapel Hill, Green earned MPH and PhD degrees in public health and epidemiology.

== Career ==
=== Public sector ===
From 1986 until 1989, Green was in charge of the Army Health Department as well as of the Epidemiology Unit at the Institute of Occupational Health and Rehabilitation (1982-1986 and 1989–1984). At the Ministry of Health between 1994 and 2008, Green was in charge of the National Center for Disease Control, and was a full professor in the research track in the Tel Aviv University Faculty of Medicine. He served a term as head of the department of epidemiology and preventive medicine in the faculty of medicine and held the Stanley and Diana Steyer endowed chair in cancer prevention and control.

=== Academia ===
Green headed the University of Haifa’s School of Public Health. From 1999 to 2003, Green served as head of the Department of Epidemiology and Preventive Medicine at the Sackler Faculty of Medicine.

=== Selected publications ===
- Myocarditis after BNT162b2 Vaccination in Israeli Adolescents
