= Noah Harpster =

American film director

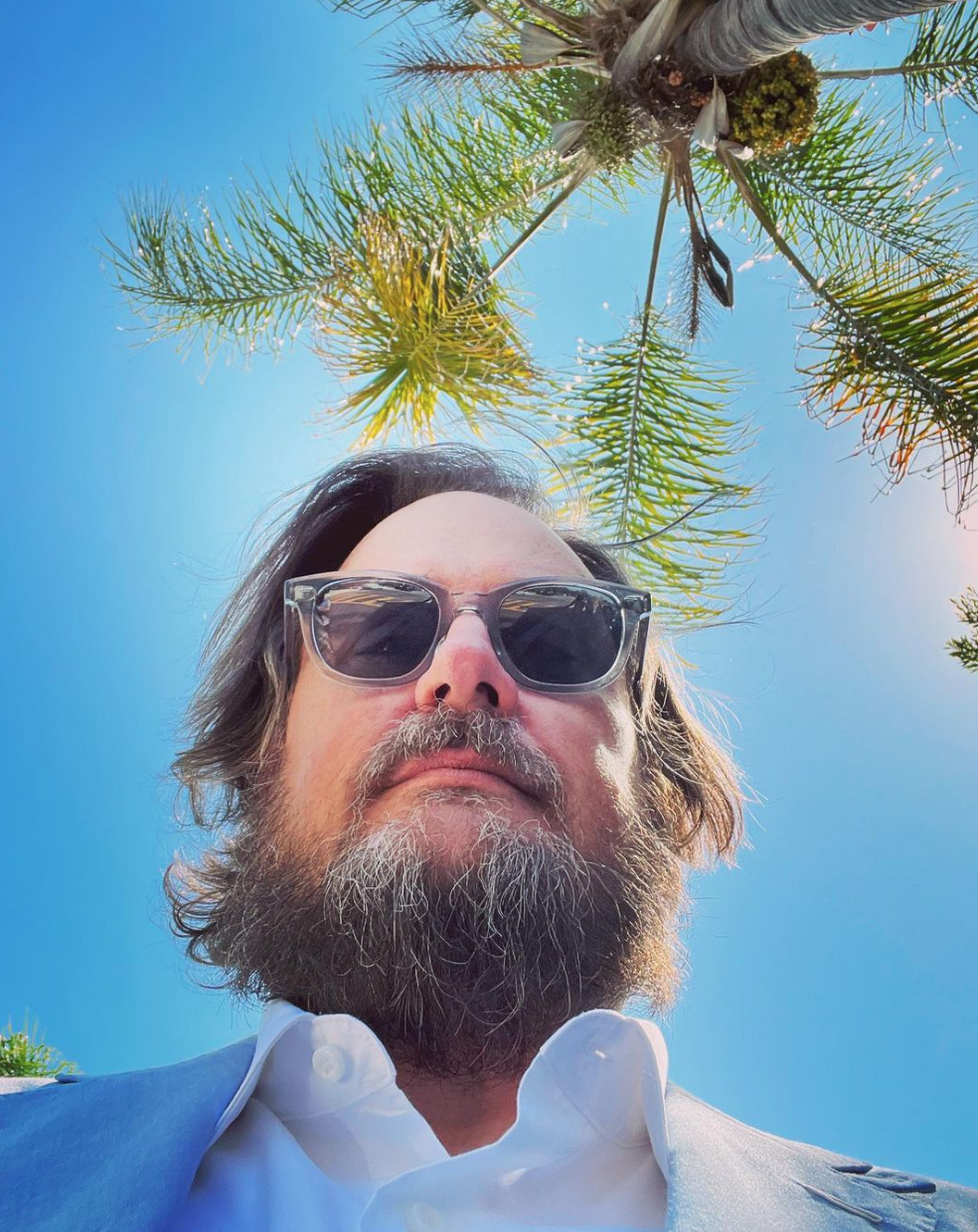
- Education: University of California, Santa Barbara (BFA)
- Occupations: Actor; Writer; Director; Producer
- Known for: A Beautiful Day in the Neighborhood; Painkiller; Transparent; One Mississippi; For All Mankind
- Awards: Humanitas Prize, PEN award, Peabody Award

Noah Harpster is an American actor, writer, producer and director. He is best known for his role of Remy on Tig Notaro's One Mississippi, and writing, producing and acting on Transparent, for which he won a Peabody Award, and was nominated for an Emmy Award, Writers Guild Award, Golden Globe Award, and GLAAD Award.

== Early life and education ==
Harpster grew up in Salinas, California. He attended Salinas High School, where he wasn't selected for the baseball team and took up acting before graduating in 1994.

He later attended the University of California, Santa Barbara and graduated with a Bachelor of Fine Arts in acting in 1998.

== Career ==
He and his writing partner Micah Fitzerman-Blue wrote the script for A Beautiful Day in the Neighborhood about Fred Rogers which landed on the Black List in 2013. After a nearly 10-year process, it was released in 2019, starring Tom Hanks, Chris Cooper, Matthew Rhys, and Harpster himself in a small role. For their screenplay, Fitzerman-Blue and Harpster were nominated for also winners of the prestigious PEN Award and the Humanities Prize.

He and Fitzerman-Blue also co-wrote Maleficent: Mistress of Evil alongside Linda Woolverton.

In 2017, they opened their production company, Blue Harp., and in 2018, he and Fitzerman-Blue were listed on Variety's 10 Screenwriters to Watch.

Since 2019 he has played NASA Mission Controller Bill Strausser in the Apple TV+ alternate history series For All Mankind, created by Ronald D. Moore, Matt Wolpert and Ben Nedivi.

In 2021, Harpster and Fitzerman-Blue created the limited series Painkiller for Netflix. Painkiller is a dramatization of the birth of the opioid crisis and stars Matthew Broderick, Uzo Aduba, Taylor Kitsch, Dina Shihabi, and West Duchovony. It is based on the reporting work done by Barry Meier for the New York Times and Patrick Radden Keefe for the New Yorker. Harpster also has an acting role in the limited series. It was released August 10, 2023.

Along with Fitzerman-Blue, he will be co-directing the film adaptation of Dash Shaw's Bottomless Belly Button.

== Filmography ==
Year	Title	Credited as			Notes
Year	Title	Writer	Executive Producer	Actor	Notes
2010	Takedowns and Falls	No	Yes	No	
2012	The Motel Life	Yes	Yes	Yes	co-written with Micah Fitzerman-Blue
2013	Afternoon Delight	No	No	Yes	
2014–2019	Transparent	Yes	Yes	Yes	co-written with Micah Fitzerman-Blue
2015–2017	One Mississippi	No	No	Yes	
2017	Legend of Master Legend	Yes	Yes	No	created and co-written with Micah Fitzerman-Blue
2019	A Beautiful Day in the Neighborhood	Yes	Yes	Yes	co-written with Micah Fitzerman-Blue
2019	Maleficent: Mistress of Evil	Yes	No	No	co-written with Micah Fitzerman-Blue
2019–2023	For All Mankind	No	No	Yes	Recurring role
2020	Magic Camp	Yes	No	No	co-written with Micah Fitzerman-Blue
2023	Painkiller	Yes	Yes	Yes	created and co-written with Micah Fitzerman-Blue
2024	Bottomless Belly Button	Yes	Yes	No	directed and co-written with Micah Fitzerman-Blue
2024	The USA vs. Vince McMahon	Yes	Yes	No	co-written with Micah Fitzerman-Blue
2025	Unt. Fernando Valenzuela series	Yes	Yes	No	co-written with Micah Fitzerman-Blue
Cancelled	Bambi	Yes	No	No	co-written with Micah Fitzerman-Blue

Additional literary material

- Christopher Robin (film) (2018)
- Cruella (2021)
- Haunted Mansion (2023)
