= Joss Sackler =

American opioid heiress (born 1989)

- Born: Jaseleen Ruggles
- Education: City University of New York
- Spouse: David Sackler
- Relatives: Sackler family

Joss Sackler is a fashion designer, rock climber and linguist. She is the co-founder of the social club Les Bouledogues Vigneronnes (LBV), as well as a fashion line brand that uses the same initialism, which ceased operations in 2023.

== Early life ==
Sackler was born to a Canadian diplomat and spent part of her childhood in Japan. After returning to Canada, she studied political science at university, and at one time, she aspired to join the Canadian Security Intelligence Service. After abandoning that aspiration, she moved to New York, where she obtained a doctorate in linguistics from the City University of New York. She wrote her dissertation on the risk assessment of violent threats made by the Mexican cartels.

== Career ==
In 2019, Sackler and Elizabeth Kennedy co-founded the fashion line brand LBV. Their spring 2020 collection, launched during 2019's New York Fashion Week, featured neon yellow and black spandex shorts, unlined lace skirts, and a variety of sweatshirts and sweatpants. Courtney Love has said that she was offered $100,000 to attend the show. Love, a recovering opioid addict, rebuked the effort on social media. Sackler said that it was an "industry standard to compensate talent for fashion show appearances", and once Love's representation named a dollar amount for her to attend the show, Sackler said no, and there was no formal offer to Love. In 2023, after an attempt to enter the mass market apparel space, the company announced that it was ceasing operations.

== Personal life ==
Sackler has a doctorate in linguistics; is a rock climbing guide, and is also a trained sommelier. In 2017, she co-founded a private social club, Les Bouledogues Vigneronnes (the winemaking bulldogs), which besides wine tasting, also features lectures, trips to fashion houses, fitness classes and dinners that recognize contemporary artists. In 2004, she was one of 58 national delegates competing for the title of Miss Canada International.

Joss is married to David Sackler, whose father Richard Sackler was a key figure in the controversial development and marketing of Oxycontin at Purdue Pharma. She has herself been addicted to opioids and has pleaded guilty to a felony offense. The couple, who have three children, moved to Palm Beach County, Florida in 2019.
