= Mundipharma =

British multinational pharmaceutical company

Mundipharma International Limited
- Logo since 5 January 2021
- Type: Private
- Industry: Pharmaceutical
- Founded: 1952; 74 years ago
- Founders: Raymond Sackler; Mortimer Sackler
- Headquarters: Cambridge Science Park, Cambridge, England, United Kingdom
- Area served: Worldwide
- Key people: Marc Princen (chairman & CEO)
- Products: Pharmaceutical drugs; Mouthwash; Soaps
- Revenue: 274 Mil. EUR
- Number of employees: 2,705 (as of 2022)
- Website: www.mundipharma.com

Mundipharma International Limited is a British multinational research-based pharmaceutical company owned by members of the Sackler family with locations in United Kingdom, Canada, Germany, China, and Singapore. In Germany, Mundipharma is a subsidiary of Mundipharma International Limited and Mundipharma AG. Its global headquarters is located at the Cambridge Science Park of Cambridge, England.

== History ==
The company was founded in 1967 in Frankfurt, Germany by the brothers Raymond and Mortimer Sackler, the owners of Purdue Pharma at the time. Between 1970 and 1974 two pharmaceutical companies were acquired. It was the chemical-pharmaceutical factory Krugmann GmbH and the pharmaceutical factory Dr. med. Hans Voigt GmbH. In 1975 the company moved to Limburg an der Lahn in Germany.

The first factory building was designed in 1973 by architect Marcel Breuer and built in the Dietkircher Höhe industrial park. The last completion of a structural expansion took place in 2010.

The company is exploring a sale as part of the Purdue Pharma bankruptcy process and Sackler family settlement. It could fetch as much as $5 billion according to Bloomberg News.

== Organization structure ==
The research area is outsourced to the following companies:

- Mundipharma Research GmbH & Co. KG, Limburg an der Lahn (closed in 2018)
- Mundipharma Research Ltd., Cambridge

== Criticism ==
=== Tobacco industry collaboration ===
Mundipharma has been condemned by healthcare professionals for its April 16th 2024 announcement that it had entered into a collaboration with Vectura, a company owned by Tobacco Transnational Philip Morris.

=== Opioid marketing ===
In relation the opioid epidemic Mundipharma has been criticized for using similar methods to Purdue Pharma to sell opioids in Europe.

=== Nyxoid ===
Mundipharma has marketed a brand of Naloxone called Nyxoid which was criticized for its prices and for Purdue's involvement in the Opioid crisis.
