= A Beautiful Day in the Neighborhood =

2019 film directed by Marielle Heller

- Theatrical release poster
- Directed by: Marielle Heller
- Screenplay by: Micah Fitzerman-Blue; Noah Harpster
- Based on: "Can You Say ... Hero?" by Tom Junod
- Produced by: Youree Henley; Peter Saraf; Marc Turtletaub; Leah Holzer
- Starring: Tom Hanks; Matthew Rhys; Susan Kelechi Watson; Chris Cooper
- Cinematography: Jody Lee Lipes
- Edited by: Anne McCabe
- Music by: Nate Heller
- Production companies: TriStar Pictures; Tencent Pictures; Big Beach; Youree Henley Productions; Fred Rogers Productions (uncredited)
- Distributed by: Sony Pictures Releasing
- Release dates: September 7, 2019 (TIFF); November 22, 2019 (United States)
- Running time: 109 minutes
- Country: United States
- Language: English
- Budget: $25 million
- Box office: $68.4 million

A Beautiful Day in the Neighborhood is a 2019 American biographical drama film on the TV host Fred Rogers, directed by Marielle Heller and written by Micah Fitzerman-Blue and Noah Harpster. The film was inspired by the 1998 article "Can You Say ... Hero?" by Tom Junod, published in Esquire. It stars Tom Hanks, Matthew Rhys, Susan Kelechi Watson, and Chris Cooper. It depicts Lloyd Vogel (Rhys), a troubled journalist for Esquire who is assigned to profile television icon Fred Rogers (Hanks).

The film premiered at the Toronto International Film Festival on September 7, 2019, and was theatrically released in the United States on November 22, 2019, by Sony Pictures Releasing. It grossed $68 million worldwide. Critics praised Hanks and Rhys's performances, Heller's direction, and its heart-warming messages. It was chosen by Time magazine as one of the ten best films of the year. For his performance, Hanks was nominated for Best Supporting Actor at the Academy Awards, as well as the Golden Globes, Critics' Choice, Screen Actors Guild Awards, and BAFTA Awards, among others.

== Plot ==
The film begins with a remake of the opening sequence of Mister Rogers' Neighborhood. Fred Rogers shows his television audience a picture board with portraits of some of his friends, including King Friday and Mr. McFeely. He then introduces a new friend, Lloyd Vogel, whom he explains has been hurt, and is having a hard time forgiving the person who hurt him.

Lloyd, a journalist for Esquire magazine known for his cynical writing, is reluctant to go to his sister Lorraine's third wedding because his estranged father Jerry will be there, but he attends with his wife Andrea, and their newborn son, Gavin. When Jerry makes an insensitive remark about Lloyd's deceased mother Lila (who he cheated on and abandoned when she was dying of cancer twenty years earlier), Lloyd becomes furious and punches his father, starting a chaotic fight in which another guest breaks his nose. Lloyd's editor, Ellen, assigns him to interview Rogers at WQED Studios in Pittsburgh for a 400-word article about heroes. Lloyd feels that the assignment is beneath him, but is informed that none of the other heroes were willing to talk to him due to his reputation. On meeting Lloyd, Rogers is dismissive of his fame and chiefly displays concern for Lloyd's nose injury. With coaxing, Lloyd admits some of the issues with his father, whose apology and attempt at reconciliation Lloyd has rebuffed. Rogers tells him his ways of dealing with anger, including striking the keys of a piano.

As Lloyd shadows Rogers on a visit to New York, he goads him with various personal questions to expose Rogers' friendly persona as an act. Rogers dodges most of the questions, but kindly accepts Lloyd's suggestion that his sons may have had some difficulties growing up due to their father working so much. Using his puppets, he gently urges Lloyd to share his memories of childhood, prompting Lloyd to recall a stuffed animal rabbit he once owned. Lloyd ends the interview when Rogers starts asking about his father. Later, he returns home to find Andrea having lunch with Jerry, along with his new wife Dorothy, leading to a tense confrontation between father and son. Lloyd refuses to accept that Jerry has changed, still resentful of him for having left his mother. During the fight, Jerry suffers a heart attack and is taken to the hospital. Overwhelmed and seeking Rogers' counsel, Lloyd abandons his father over Andrea's objections and boards a bus to Pittsburgh, interrupting a taping of Mister Rogers' Neighborhood by collapsing on the soundstage. He imagines himself on an episode of the show, where Rogers and Andrea (as Lady Aberlin) encourage him to open up about his sadness. He then sees a vision of his mother, telling him he does not need to be angry on her behalf.

Rogers and his wife Joanne take Lloyd to their home to recuperate. Rogers encourages Lloyd to think about the people who loved and raised him, including Jerry, and urges him to forgive Jerry. Lloyd returns home and apologizes to Andrea for leaving her and Gavin at the hospital, and visits Jerry and Dorothy at their home. He learns Jerry is dying of cardiac stenosis, hence his attempts to reconnect with Lloyd. Lloyd forgives Jerry, promising to be a better father. Later Lorraine, her husband Todd, and Rogers visit Jerry. Jerry dies shortly after the visit, and Lloyd's 10,000-word article, "Can You Say... Hero?" is published as Esquire's cover story.

At his studio, Rogers finishes the episode about Lloyd, showing off the last photo on his picture board depicting Lloyd happily reunited with his family. He bids his television audience goodbye and filming wraps. As the crew leaves, Rogers remains behind, playing the piano alone. He briefly stops, strikes the keys to let off some steam, and resumes playing.

== Cast ==
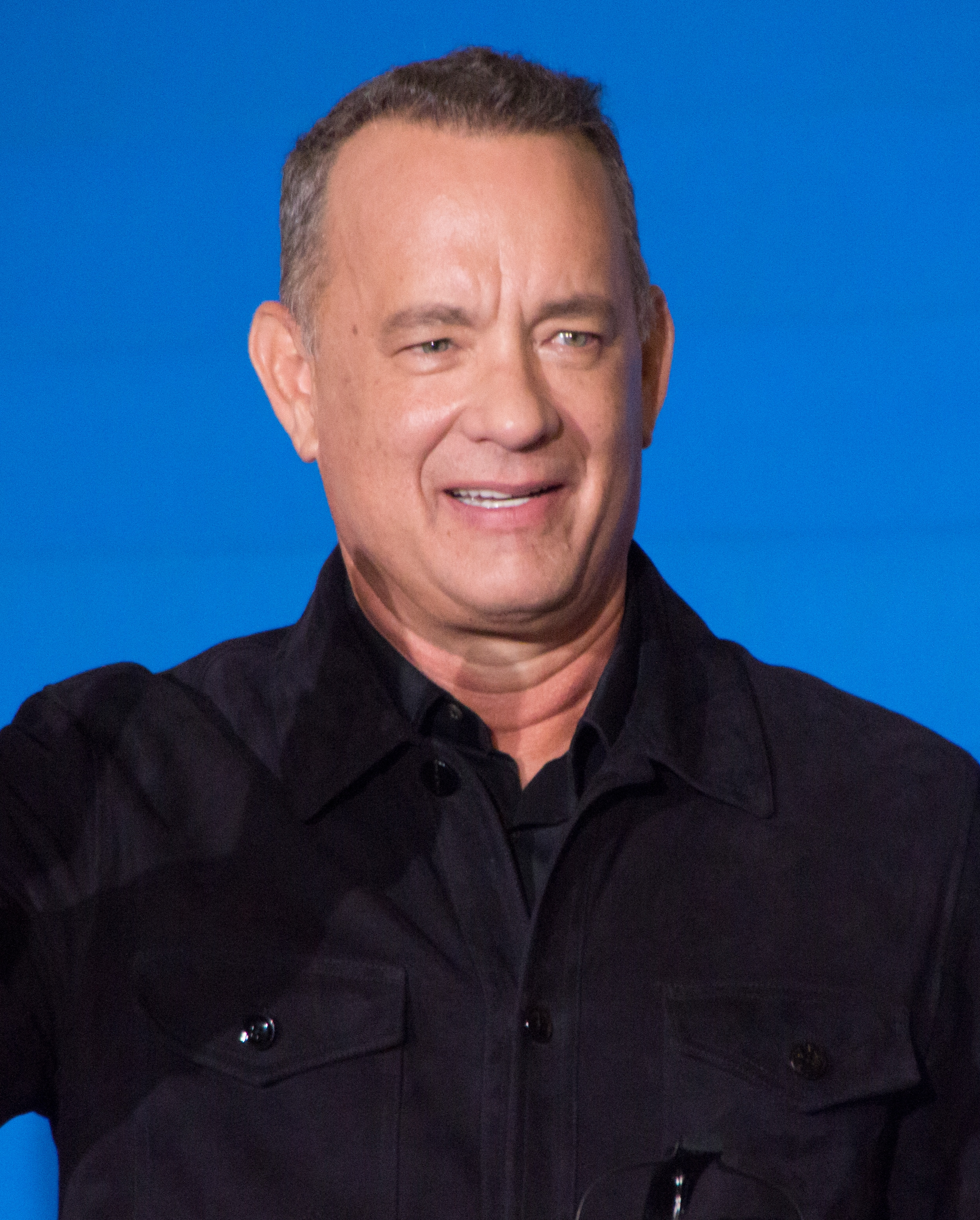
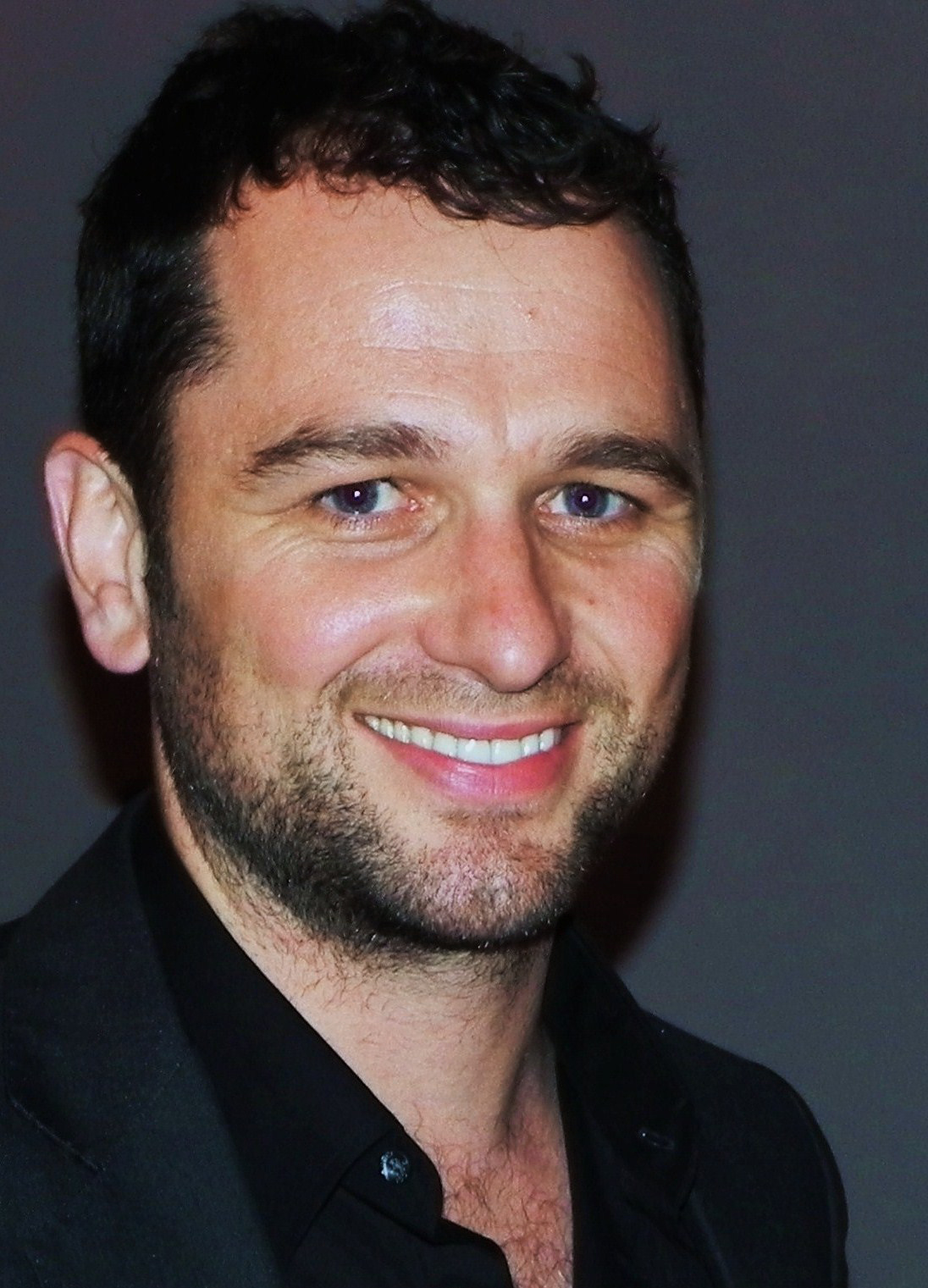
Tom Hanks (left) and Matthew Rhys play Fred Rogers and Lloyd Vogel respectively. Hanks garnered critical acclaim for his performance as Rogers, earning a nomination for the Academy Award for Best Supporting Actor.
- Tom Hanks as Fred Rogers:
  The creator and host of Mister Rogers' Neighborhood. To prepare for his role, Hanks visited the Fred Rogers Center at Saint Vincent College in Latrobe, Pennsylvania, for research in the Fred Rogers Archives and also watched Won't You Be My Neighbor?, a 2018 documentary film. At the 2019 Toronto International Film Festival, Hanks recalled watching "hundreds of hours" of footage of Rogers on set and behind the scenes in order to get into character. Heller noted that Rogers "doesn't have the dynamic nature you need for a protagonist for a movie" and considered him "the antagonist [...] who comes into someone's life and flips it upside down through his philosophy and the way he lived his life".
- Matthew Rhys as Lloyd Vogel:
  A cynical journalist who is assigned to profile Fred Rogers for the magazine Esquire. Lloyd is based loosely on journalist Tom Junod, whose encounter with Rogers was adapted into the film. Director Marielle Heller described Lloyd as the viewer's "entry point into Fred's teachings" and expressed hope that Lloyd's character development and growth as a new father would compel viewers to reflect upon themselves.
- Chris Cooper as Jerry Vogel:
  Lloyd's estranged father and a philanderer who cheated on his dying wife Lila twenty years before the events of the film. In a press interview for the film, Cooper described his character as "multidimensional" and compared filming a scene with Hanks to seeing the "eyes of God".
- Susan Kelechi Watson as Andrea Vogel:
  A public attorney, Lloyd's wife, and a fan of Rogers' show. Watson, herself a fan of Mister Rogers' Neighborhood, described her character as a "career woman" who faces unique challenges of patience and adaptation as the mother of a newborn.
- Maryann Plunkett as Joanne Rogers:
  Fred's wife. Plunkett met with Joanne Rogers to prepare for the role.
- Enrico Colantoni as Bill Isler:
  The President & CEO of Family Communications. In a radio interview, Colantoni said he became friends with the real Bill Isler while filming and described his character as having been "so important to Fred".
- Wendy Makkena as Dorothy Vogel:
  Jerry's second wife. Makkena described her character as part of Vogel's "dysfunctional, complicated family".
- Tammy Blanchard as Lorraine Vogel: Lloyd's sister and Todd's wife.
- Noah Harpster as Todd: Lorraine's husband and Lloyd's brother-in-law.
- Christine Lahti as Ellen: Lloyd's editor.

Additional cast members include Carmen Cusack as Margy, a producer of Mister Rogers' Neighborhood; Jessica Hecht as Lila Vogel, Lloyd's late mother and Jerry's ex-wife; Maddie Corman as Betty Aberlin, an actress starring as Lady Aberlin on Mister Rogers' Neighborhood; Daniel Krell as Mr. McFeely; and Jordan, Naomi, and Zoey Harsh as Gavin Vogel, Lloyd's son.

Notable cameos in the film include Rogers' wife Joanne, Mr. McFeely actor David Newell, Family Communications head Bill Isler, and Mister Rogers' Neighborhood producer Margy Whitmer who appear as customers in a restaurant that Rogers and Lloyd meet in. Arsenio Hall and Oprah Winfrey make uncredited appearances in archive footage of talk shows that Lloyd watches in the film, and Fred Rogers appears in archive footage of his show during the ending credits, singing the song "You've Got to Do It".

== Production ==
=== Development ===
On January 29, 2018, it was announced that Sony's TriStar Pictures had bought the worldwide distribution rights to the film You Are My Friend, a biographical film based on a 1998 Esquire magazine article about television personality Fred Rogers, who would be played by Tom Hanks. The script by Micah Fitzerman-Blue and Noah Harpster appeared on the 2013 Black List of best unproduced screenplays. It would be directed by Marielle Heller; its producers would be Big Beach's Marc Turtletaub and Peter Saraf along with Youree Henley.

In July 2018, Matthew Rhys signed to play journalist Lloyd Vogel, with production set to start in September 2018. Being Welsh, Rhys had never heard of Fred Rogers before he was offered the role. In August 2018, Chris Cooper was added to play Vogel's father; and in September, Susan Kelechi Watson was added. In October 2018, Enrico Colantoni, Maryann Plunkett, Tammy Blanchard, Wendy Makkena, Sakina Jaffrey, Carmen Cusack, Harpster and Maddie Corman joined the cast. In 2018, Nate Heller was chosen to score the film.

Film director Marielle Heller publicly stated that the film was not a biopic, as it covered the life of Fred Rogers in a more limited scope by focusing mainly on just his "philosophy and practice." Heller stated that a recent documentary was in fact closer to being a biopic about Rogers.

=== Filming ===
Principal photography began on September 10, 2018, in Pittsburgh, with several sets converted into New York City. Filming also took place in the Fred Rogers Studio at WQED (TV) where the late television host recorded Mister Rogers' Neighborhood, and at the Jewish Community Center in Squirrel Hill. The crew consulted with original crew members from Rogers' television series, and brought in the same cameras and monitors used in the original production. The film received tax credits of approximately $9.5 million against a production budget of $45 million for filming in Pittsburgh. Production wrapped on November 9, 2018.

On October 12, 2018, sound mixer James Emswiller had a heart attack and fell from a second-story balcony while on set filming in Mt. Lebanon. He was taken to University of Pittsburgh Medical Center-Mercy, where he was pronounced dead.

== Release ==
A Beautiful Day in the Neighborhood premiered at the Toronto International Film Festival on September 7, 2019. It was originally going to be released on October 18, 2019, by Sony Pictures Releasing, but in May 2018, it was announced that the release would be pushed back a month to November 22, 2019. It was released in China on September 18, 2020, after the country reopened theaters following COVID-19 pandemic lockdowns.

=== Marketing ===
The film's title was announced on December 27, 2018. The trailer was released on July 22, 2019.

=== Home media ===
The film was released by Sony Pictures Home Entertainment on Digital HD on February 4, 2020, and on Ultra HD Blu-ray, Blu-ray and DVD on February 18.

== Reception ==
=== Box office ===
A Beautiful Day in the Neighborhood grossed $61.7 million in the United States and Canada, and $6.7 million in other territories, for a worldwide total of $68.4 million, against a production budget of $25 million.

In the United States and Canada, it was released alongside Frozen 2 and 21 Bridges, and was projected to gross around $15 million from 3,231 theaters in its opening weekend. It made $4.5 million on its first day, including $900,000 from Thursday night previews. It went on to debut to $13.3 million, finishing third at the box office. It fell just 11% in its second weekend, making $11.8 million and finishing fifth, and remained in fifth place the following weekend with $5.2 million.

=== Critical response ===
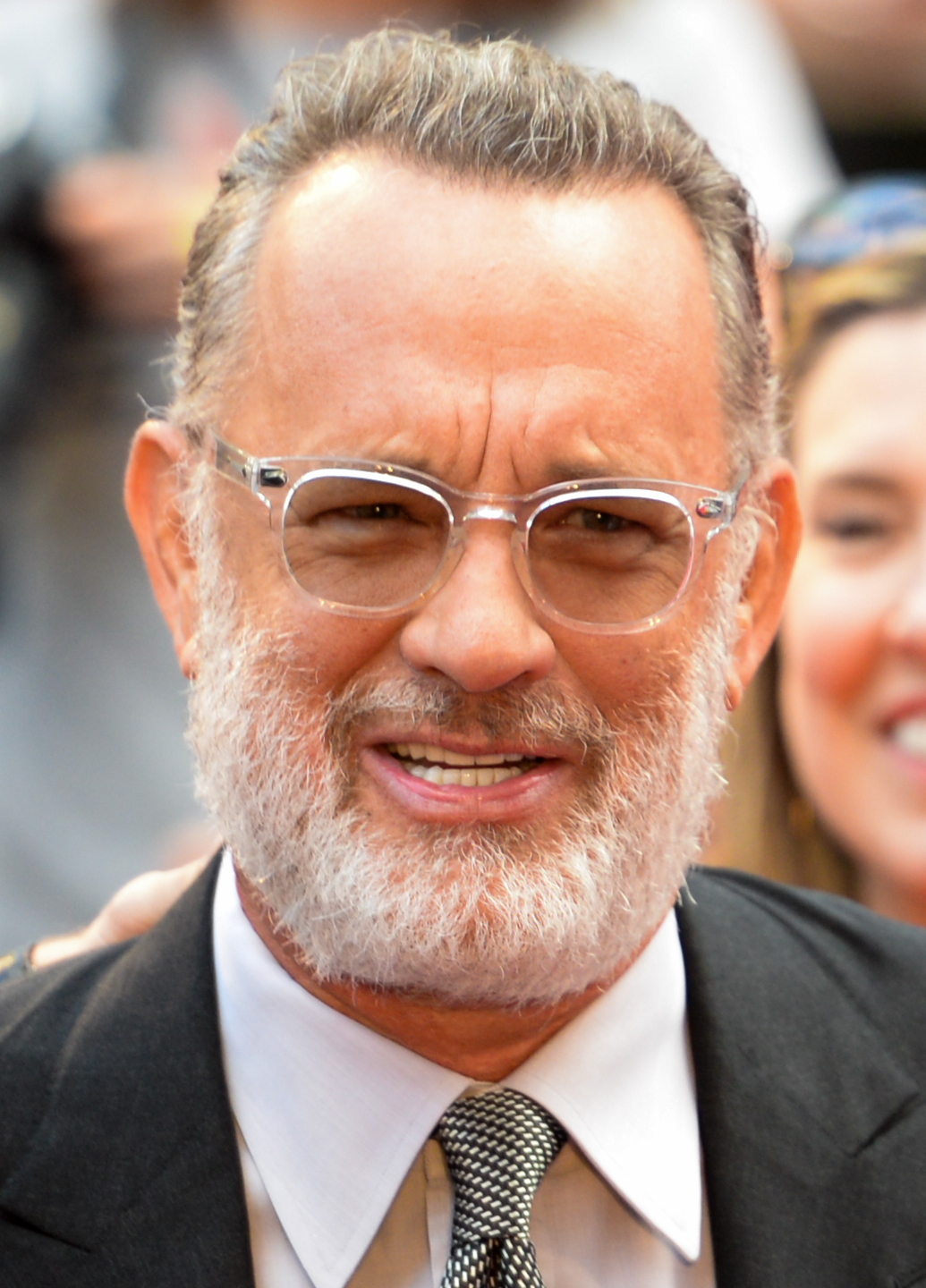
Tom Hanks (pictured in 2019) was praised by critics for his performance as Fred Rogers

On review aggregation website Rotten Tomatoes, the film holds an approval rating of 95% based on 372 reviews, with an average rating of 8/10. The website's critical consensus reads, "Much like the beloved TV personality that inspired it, A Beautiful Day in the Neighborhood offers a powerfully affecting message about acceptance and understanding." On Metacritic, the film has a weighted average score of 80 out of 100, based on 50 critics, indicating "generally favorable" reviews. Audiences polled by CinemaScore gave the film an average grade of "A" on an A+ to F scale, while those at PostTrak gave it an average four out of five stars, with 66% saying they would definitely recommend it.

Steve Pond of TheWrap wrote: "A Beautiful Day in the Neighborhood finds a gentle state of grace and shows the courage and smarts to stay in that zone, never rushing things or playing for drama ... But just as Mr. Rogers used his show to talk about big issues with children in a tone that was softer and more halting than you'd expect given the subject matter, so does Heller stick to understatement in a way that threatens to become dull or sappy but never does." Benjamin Lee of The Guardian wrote: "It's a given that Hanks will nab at least a best supporting actor nomination but it would be all too easy to forget his co-star. The cynic-becomes-a-believer arc is age old but it unfolds here without cliche thanks to an emotionally intelligent script from Noah Harpster and Micah Fitzerman-Blue, but mainly because of a marvelous, prickly turn from Rhys."

Armond White of the National Review was more critical: "Heller and screenwriters Micah Fitzerman-Blue and Noah Harpster don't show enough faith in Rogers' remedies—and not enough interest in their religious origins. In short, the movie seems wary of faith (it briefly mentions that Rogers was an ordained minister) and settles for secular sentimentality to account for his sensibility and behavior. This not only weakens the film, but it also hobbles Hanks's characterization."

=== Accolades ===
Award	Date of ceremony	Category	Recipient(s)	Result	Ref(s)
AARP Movies for Grownups Awards	January 19, 2020	Best Movie for Grownups	A Beautiful Day in the Neighborhood	Nominated	
AARP Movies for Grownups Awards	January 19, 2020	Best Supporting Actor	Tom Hanks	Won	
AARP Movies for Grownups Awards	January 19, 2020	Best Buddy Picture	A Beautiful Day in the Neighborhood	Nominated	
AARP Movies for Grownups Awards	January 19, 2020	Best Intergenerational Movie	A Beautiful Day in the Neighborhood	Nominated	
AARP Movies for Grownups Awards	January 19, 2020	Readers' Choice	A Beautiful Day in the Neighborhood	Won	
Academy Awards	February 9, 2020	Best Supporting Actor	Tom Hanks	Nominated	
Alliance of Women Film Journalists	January 10, 2020	Best Writing, Adapted Screenplay	Micah Fitzerman-Blue and Noah Harpster	Nominated	
Alliance of Women Film Journalists	January 10, 2020	Best Supporting Actor	Tom Hanks	Nominated	
Alliance of Women Film Journalists	January 10, 2020	Best Woman Director	Marielle Heller	Nominated	
Austin Film Critics Association	January 22, 2020	Best Adapted Screenplay	Micah Fitzerman-Blue and Noah Harpster	Nominated	
Art Directors Guild Awards	February 1, 2020	Excellence in Production Design for a Contemporary Film	Jade Healy	Nominated	
British Academy Film Awards	February 2, 2020	Best Actor in a Supporting Role	Tom Hanks	Nominated	
Central Ohio Film Critics Association	January 2, 2020	Best Supporting Actor	Tom Hanks	Nominated	
Central Ohio Film Critics Association	January 2, 2020	Best Adapted Screenplay	Micah Fitzerman-Blue and Noah Harpster	Nominated	
Chicago Film Critics Association Awards	December 14, 2019	Best Supporting Actor	Tom Hanks	Nominated	
Chicago Film Critics Association Awards	December 14, 2019	Best Adapted Screenplay	Micah Fitzerman-Blue and Noah Harpster	Nominated	
Chicago Independent Film Critics Circle Awards	January 4, 2020	Best Supporting Actor	Tom Hanks	Nominated	
Costume Designers Guild Awards	January 28, 2020	Excellence in Contemporary Film	Arjun Bhasin	Nominated	
Critics' Choice Movie Awards	January 12, 2020	Best Supporting Actor	Tom Hanks	Nominated	
Critics' Choice Movie Awards	January 12, 2020	Best Adapted Screenplay	Micah Fitzerman-Blue and Noah Harpster	Nominated	
Denver Film Critics Society	January 6, 2020	Best Supporting Actor	Tom Hanks	Nominated	
Denver Film Critics Society	January 6, 2020	Best Adapted Screenplay	Micah Fitzerman-Blue and Noah Harpster	Nominated	
Detroit Film Critics Society Awards	December 6, 2019	Best Supporting Actor	Tom Hanks	Nominated	
Florida Film Critics Circle Awards	December 23, 2019	Best Supporting Actor	Tom Hanks	Nominated	
Florida Film Critics Circle Awards	December 23, 2019	Best Screenplay	Micah Fitzerman-Blue and Noah Harpster	Nominated	
Georgia Film Critics Association	January 10, 2020	Best Supporting Actor	Tom Hanks	Nominated	
Golden Globe Awards	January 5, 2020	Best Supporting Actor—Motion Picture	Tom Hanks	Nominated	
Golden Schmoes Awards	2019	Best Supporting Actor of the Year	Tom Hanks	Nominated	
Grammy Awards	March 14, 2021	Best Compilation Soundtrack for Visual Media	A Beautiful Day in the Neighborhood – Various Artists	Nominated	
Greater Western New York Film Critics Association Awards	November 10, 2019	Best Adapted Screenplay	Micah Fitzerman-Blue and Noah Harpster	Nominated	
Hawaii Film Critics Society	January 13, 2020	Best Supporting Actor	Tom Hanks	Nominated	
Hawaii Film Critics Society	January 13, 2020	Best Adapted Screenplay	Micah Fitzerman-Blue and Noah Harpster	Nominated	
Hollywood Critics Association	January 9, 2020	Best Supporting Actor	Tom Hanks	Nominated	
IGN Summer Movie Awards	2019	Best Supporting Performer in a Movie	Tom Hanks	Nominated	
Indiana Film Journalists Association	August 16, 2019	Best Picture	A Beautiful Day in the Neighborhood	Nominated	
Indiana Film Journalists Association	August 16, 2019	Best Adapted Screenplay	Micah Fitzerman-Blue and Noah Harpster	Nominated	
Iowa Film Critics Awards	January 12, 2020	Best Supporting Actor	Tom Hanks	Nominated	
Las Vegas Film Critics Society Awards	December 13, 2019	Best Picture	A Beautiful Day in the Neighborhood	Nominated	
London Film Critics Circle Awards 2019	January 30, 2020	Supporting Actor of the Year	Tom Hanks	Nominated	
Movieguide Awards	January 24, 2020	Best Movie for Mature Audiences	A Beautiful Day in the Neighborhood	Won	
Movieguide Awards	January 24, 2020	Most Inspiring Movie	A Beautiful Day in the Neighborhood	Nominated	
Movieguide Awards	January 24, 2020	Most Inspiring Performance in Movies	Tom Hanks	Nominated	
North Carolina Film Critics Association	January 3, 2020	Best Supporting Actor	Tom Hanks	Nominated	
North Carolina Film Critics Association	January 3, 2020	Best Adapted Screenplay	Micah Fitzerman-Blue and Noah Harpster	Nominated	
North Texas Film Critics Association	December 16, 2019	Best Picture	A Beautiful Day in the Neighborhood	Won	
North Texas Film Critics Association	December 16, 2019	Best Supporting Actor	Tom Hanks	Nominated	
Online Film & Television Association	February 2, 2020	Best Supporting Actor	Tom Hanks	Nominated	
Online Film & Television Association	February 2, 2020	Best Writing, Screenplay Based on Material from Another Medium	Micah Fitzerman-Blue and Noah Harpster	Nominated	
Online Film & Television Association	February 2, 2020	Most Cinematic Moment	A Moment of Silence	Nominated	
Online Film & Television Association	February 2, 2020	Best Titles Sequence		Nominated	
Online Film Critics Society Awards	January 6, 2020	Best Adapted Screenplay	Micah Fitzerman-Blue and Noah Harpster	Nominated	
Phoenix Critics Circle	December 14, 2019	Best Supporting Actor	Tom Hanks	Nominated	
San Francisco Film Critics Circle	December 16, 2019	Best Screenplay Adapted	Micah Fitzerman-Blue and Noah Harpster	Nominated	
Satellite Awards	December 19, 2019	Best Supporting Actor—Motion Picture	Tom Hanks	Nominated	
Screen Actors Guild Awards	January 19, 2020	Outstanding Performance by a Male Actor in a Supporting Role	Tom Hanks	Nominated	
Seattle Film Critics Awards	December 16, 2019	Actor	Tom Hanks	Nominated	
Society of Camera Operators	2020	Feature Film	Sam Ellison	Nominated	
Vancouver Film Critics Circle	January 6, 2020	Best Supporting Actor	Tom Hanks	Nominated	
Washington D.C. Area Film Critics Association	December 8, 2019	Best Supporting Actor	Tom Hanks	Nominated	
Washington D.C. Area Film Critics Association	December 8, 2019	Best Adapted Screenplay	Micah Fitzerman-Blue and Noah Harpster	Nominated	
Writers Guild of America Awards	February 1, 2020	Best Adapted Screenplay	Micah Fitzerman-Blue and Noah Harpster	Nominated	
