= Gray Faculty of Medical and Health Sciences =

Medical school in Israel

Coordinates: 32°7′0.42″N 34°48′20.39″E

- הפקולטה למדעי הרפואה והבריאות ע"ש גריי
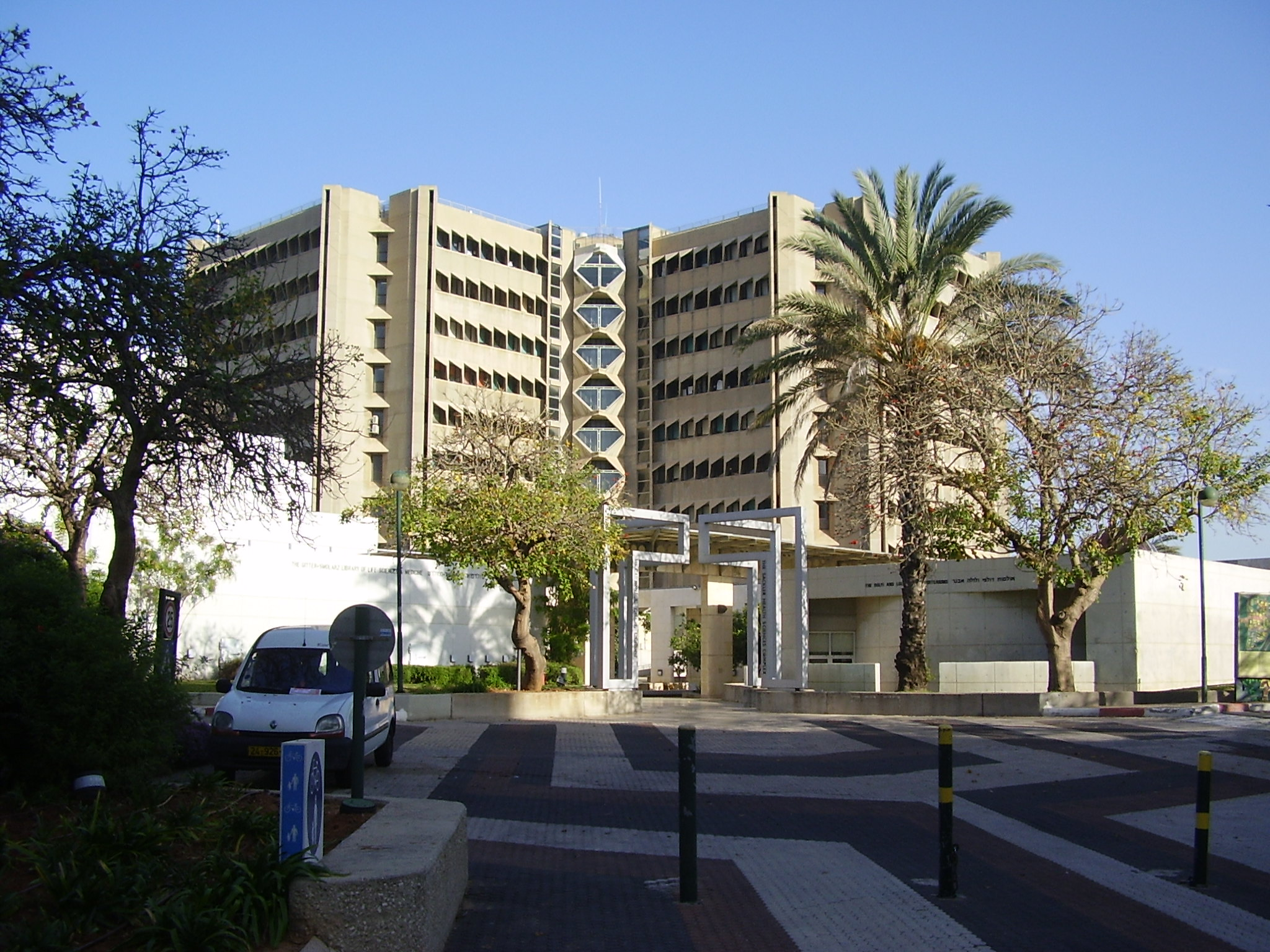
- The Gray Faculty of Medical and Health Sciences building
- Established: 1964
- Parent institution: Tel Aviv University
- Dean: Karen Avraham
- Students: 4,000
- Location: Tel Aviv, Israel
- Website: https://en-med.tau.ac.il/

Gray Faculty of Medical and Health Sciences (formerly Sackler Faculty of Medicine) is a medical school affiliated with Tel Aviv University, located in Tel Aviv, Israel.

== History ==
The Sackler School of Medicine was named for Arthur, Mortimer and Raymond Sackler. Purdue Pharma, the Sacklers' pharmaceutical company, was the developer of OxyContin, a version of the opioid analgesic compound, oxycodone. All three Sacklers were medical professionals who made substantial donations to the school. Each year the school has presented the Sackler Prize for a significant contribution to the fields of physics or chemistry.

The school has consistently been ranked one of the 151-200 best medical schools according to the Shanghai Global Ranking of Academic Subjects.

=== Naming controversy ===
Tel Aviv University received public pressure to remove the Sackler name from the name of the medical school due to ongoing controversy regarding the Sackler family and their alleged role in and lawsuits pertaining to the marketing and, consequently, the overprescription of addictive pharmaceutical drugs, including OxyContin. In 2019, Physicians for Human Rights–Israel said it had sent a letter to the dean of the Sackler School of Medicine requesting that the family's name be removed. Rabbi Yuval Cherlow, a leading ethicist in Israel and ethics chairman at both Israel's organ donation association and Tzohar, a group that reaches out to secular Jews, has publicly criticized the medical program for maintaining the name.

The Medical school decided in 2022 to remove the Sackler name from their U.S. facing Medical Program. In 2023 the Tel Aviv University administration reached an agreement with the Sackler family to remove the name Sackler from the Faculty of Medicine. The name was changed to the Faculty of Medical and Health Sciences in February 2024. In May 2025, it was announced that Jonathan Gray and his wife Mindy will donate $125 million through the Gray Foundation to the faculty, which will be renamed the Gray Faculty of Medical and Health Sciences.

=== Schools ===
- School of Medicine
- New York State / American Program
- School of Public Health
- School of Continuing Medical Education (CME)
- School of Dental Medicine
- The Stanley Steyer School of Health Professions
- The Dr. Miriam and Sheldon G. Adelson Graduate School of Medicine

== New York State-American Program ==
The New York State/American Program is chartered by the Regents of the University of the State of New York and is accredited by the State of Israel. Established in 1976, the Program is taught in English, with class size limited to 63. The program is open to citizens or permanent residents of the United States or Canada. The goal of the program is to provide graduates with a comprehensive academic foundation in the science of human disease and the clinical skills needed for diagnoses and treatment. Sackler strives to cultivate qualities that foster an empathetic, ethical doctor-patient relationship. Its curriculum and teaching methods are modeled after those of U.S. medical schools. Classes are small. Classroom, laboratory and clinical sessions are supplemented by self-study and by tutoring and seminars in small groups. Clinical clerkships begin in the third year. At the beginning of the fourth year, students take 16 weeks of electives at U.S. medical institutions.

Israeli teaching institutions affiliated with Sackler include seven major medical centers, seven psychiatric hospitals, 20 research institutes and a large rehabilitation center.

Graduates enter the National Resident Matching Program to secure medical residencies, much like students from medical schools in the US.

In 2023, Israel phased out all American medical programs in order to make more spots for Israeli students, with the final students graduating in 2026.

== See also ==
- List of universities in Israel
- List of medical schools in Israel
