= Sackler family =

American billionaire family in pharmaceuticals

The Sackler family is an American family who owned the pharmaceutical company Purdue Pharma and later founded Mundipharma. Purdue Pharma, and some members of the family, have faced lawsuits regarding over-prescription of addictive pharmaceutical drugs, including OxyContin. Purdue Pharma has been criticized for its central role in the opioid epidemic in the United States.

== History ==
Arthur, Mortimer, and Raymond Sackler, the three children of Galician Jewish immigrants, grew up in Brooklyn in the 1930s. All three siblings went to medical school and worked together at the Creedmoor Psychiatric Center in Queens. They were regarded as the first to fight for the racial integration of blood banks. Arthur Sackler was widely regarded as the patriarch of the family. In 1952, the brothers bought Purdue-Frederick, a small pharmaceutical company. Raymond and Mortimer ran Purdue, while Arthur, the oldest brother, pioneered medical advertising. He devised campaigns appealing directly to doctors, and enlisted prominent physicians to endorse Purdue's products. As one of the foremost art collectors of his generation, Arthur also donated most of his collections to museums around the world. After he died in 1987, his estate sold his option on one-third of Purdue-Frederick to his two brothers, who turned it into Purdue Pharma.

In 1916, researchers Martin Freund and Edmund Speyer first synthesized the opioid oxycodone, which was subsequently marketed as the analgesic Eukodal by Merck & Co. A case of "eucodalism" was first described in 1919, and its symptoms were compared to those of morphine addiction.

8-hour 2015 deposition of Richard Sackler about his family's role in the opioid crisis in the United States.

In 1996, Purdue Pharma introduced OxyContin, a reformulated version of oxycodone in a slow-release form. Heavily promoted, OxyContin is a key drug in the emergence of the opioid epidemic.

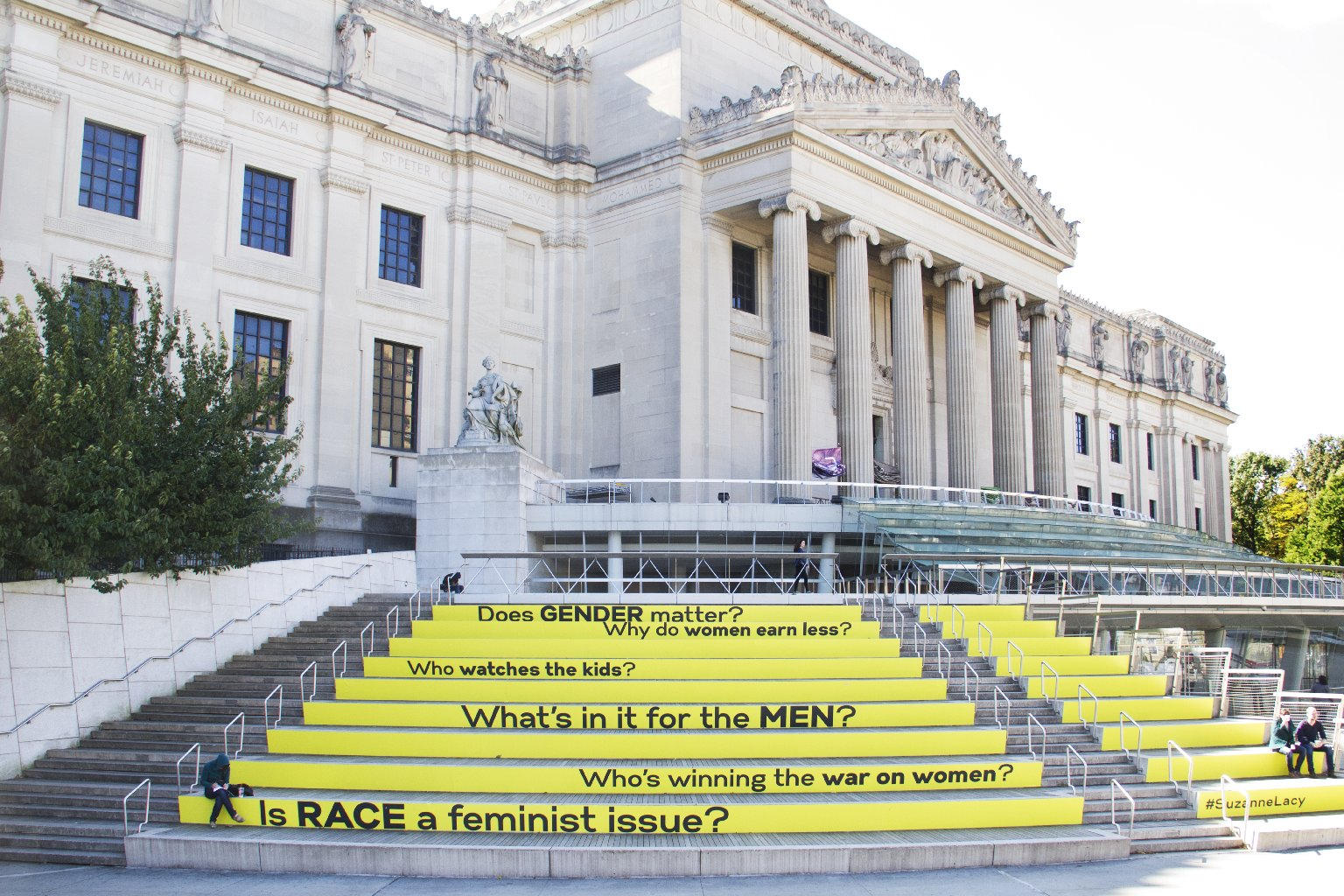
The Elizabeth A. Sackler Center for Feminist Art, located on the fourth floor of the Brooklyn Museum, is named after and was founded by Elizabeth Sackler. She maintains that did not participate in, or benefit from, the sales of narcotics.

Elizabeth Sackler, daughter of Arthur Sackler, claimed that her branch of the family did not participate in or benefit from the sales of narcotics. Some have criticized Arthur Sackler for pioneering marketing techniques to promote non-opioids decades earlier.

In 2018, multiple members of the Raymond and Mortimer Sackler families—Richard Sackler, Theresa Sackler, Kathe Sackler, Jonathan Sackler, Mortimer Sackler, Beverly Sackler, David Sackler, and Ilene Sackler—were named as defendants in suits filed by numerous states over their involvement in the opioid epidemic in the United States.

In 2012, a member of the Sackler family bought Stargroves, a manor house near Newbury in the United Kingdom, for more than its £15 million listing price; former owners at different times of the estate have been Mick Jagger and Rod Stewart. The family was first listed in Forbes list of America's Richest Families in 2015.

The Sackler family also owns Mundipharma, a lower-profile pharma company with significant operations in China. Bloomberg News reported in 2020 that the family had hired an investment bank to identify a potential buyer of the business. The company could fetch as much as $3 to $5 billion.

They have been described as the "most evil family in America", and "the worst drug dealers in history".

== Genealogy ==
- Isaac Sackler and Sophie Greenberg
  - Arthur M. Sackler, (1913–1987), married Else Finnich Jorgensen in 1934 and divorced, married Marietta Lutze in 1949 and divorced, and Jillian Lesley Tully (1940–2025) in 1980 until his death
    - Marriage to Else Finnich Jorgensen:
      - Carol Master (b. 1941)
      - Elizabeth Sackler (b. 1948)
        - Michael Sackler-Berner (b. 1983)
    - Marriage to Marietta Lutze
      - Arthur Felix Sackler (b. 1950)
      - Denise Marika (b. 1955)
  - Mortimer Sackler (1916–2010) obtained British citizenship and renounced American citizenship. Married Muriel Lazarus (1917–2009) and divorced, married Gertraud (Gheri) Wimmer in 1969 and divorced, and married Theresa Elizabeth Rowling (b. 1949) in 1980 until his death.
    - Marriage to Muriel Lazarus:
      - Ilene Sackler Lefcourt (b. 1946) (married Gerald B. Lefcourt and divorced)
      - Kathe Sackler (b. 1948) (married Susan Shack Sackler)
      - Robert Mortimer Sackler (1951–1975)
    - Marriage to Gertrude Wimmer:
      - Mortimer A. Sackler (b. 1971) (married Jaqueline Sackler)
      - Samantha Sophia Sackler Hunt (b. 1968)
    - Marriage to Theresa Rowling:
      - Marissa Sackler
      - Sophie Sackler (married Jamie Dalrymple)
      - Michael Sackler
  - Raymond Sackler (1920–2017), married Beverly Feldman in 1944 until death Beverly died in October 2019, aged 95
    - Richard Sackler, born 1945, married Beth Sackler and divorced.
      - David Sackler (married Joss Ruggles)
      - Marianna Sackler (married James Frame)
    - Jonathan Sackler (1955–2020)
      - Clare Sackler
      - Madeleine Sackler, Emmy Award-winning filmmaker
      - Miles Sackler

== Donations to various causes ==
The Sackler family has donated to cultural institutions, including the Metropolitan Museum of Art, the American Museum of Natural History, and the Guggenheim.

The family has also donated to universities, including Harvard University, Yale University, Cornell University, and the University of Oxford, although the latter severed ties in 2023. The Sackler Faculty of Medicine at Tel Aviv University is named after Arthur, Mortimer, and Raymond Sackler for their donations but the name was removed in June 2023. Similarly, the Sackler Institute of Pulmonary Pharmacology at King's College London was named after Mortimer and Theresa Sackler.

The Sackler family has previously donated to the China International Culture Exchange Center (CICEC), a front organization of China's principal civilian intelligence agency, the Ministry of State Security.

The Sackler family contributed about $116,000 to the Democratic Party of Connecticut.

=== Reputation laundering ===
The Sackler family name, as used in institutions which the family have donated to, saw increased scrutiny in the late 2010s over the family's association with OxyContin. David Crow, writing in the Financial Times, described the family name as "tainted" (cf. Tainted donors). In March 2019, the National Portrait Gallery and the Tate galleries announced that they would not accept further donations from the family. This came after the American photographer Nan Goldin threatened to withdraw a planned retrospective of her work in the National Portrait Gallery if the gallery accepted a £1 million donation from a Sackler fund. In June 2019, NYU Langone Medical Center announced they will no longer be accepting donations from the Sacklers, and have since changed the name of the Sackler Institute of Graduate Biomedical Sciences to the Vilcek Institute of Graduate Biomedical Sciences. Later in 2019, the American Museum of Natural History, and the Solomon R. Guggenheim Museum and Metropolitan Museum of Art in New York, each announced they will not accept future donations from any Sacklers that were involved in Purdue Pharma.

Elizabeth Sackler has denied that her branch of the family, including herself and her children, have "benefited in any way" from the sale of Oxycontin or ever held shares in Purdue Pharma. Articles confirmed that her father's option in a different pharmaceutical company, Purdue Frederick, were sold shortly after his death in 1987, to Purdue Pharma owners Mortimer and Raymond Sackler, years before the advent of Oxycontin. Online outlet Hyperallergic reviewed legal documents confirming her statement and later articles in the New York Times, Associated Press, and other outlets published clarifications and corrections all confirming her branch of the family's separation from Purdue Pharma and all Oxycontin profits. She has raised support for Nan Goldin.

On July 1, 2019, Nan Goldin, an American photographer and the founder of P.A.I.N., led a small group of protesters who unfurled a banner "Take down the Sackler name" against the backdrop of the Louvre's glass pyramid. According to The New York Times, the Louvre in Paris was the first major museum to "erase its public association" with the Sackler family name. On July 16, 2019, the museum had removed the plaque at the gallery entrance about Sacklers’ donations made to the museum. Throughout the gallery, grey tape covered signs such as Sackler Wing, including signage for the Louvre's Persian and Levantine artifacts collection, which was removed on July 8 or 9. Signage for the collection had identified it as the Sackler Wing of Oriental Antiquities since 1997.

The Metropolitan Museum of Art announced it would remove the Sackler name from galleries and other locations within the museum in December 2021. This was followed by the Bodleian Library's "Sackler Library", which has since been renamed the Bodleian Art, Archaeology and Ancient World Library.

The family's philanthropy has been characterized as reputation laundering from profits acquired from the selling of opiates. Michael Sackler was characterized as seeking an "identity makeover." In 2022, the British Museum announced that it would rename the Raymond and Beverly Sackler Rooms and the Raymond and Beverly Sackler Wing, as part of "development of the new masterplan", and that it "made this decision together through collaborative discussions" with the Sackler Foundation.

== Opioid lawsuits ==
In 2019, a suit was brought in the Southern District of New York, which included more than 500 counties, cities and Native American tribes. It named eight family members: Richard, Jonathan, Mortimer, Kathe, David, Beverly and Theresa Sackler as well as Ilene Sackler Lefcourt. In addition, Massachusetts, Connecticut, Rhode Island and Utah all brought suits against the family. On the federal level, the family faced an overall bundle of 1,600 cases.

According to the New Yorker, Purdue Pharma played a "special role" in the opioid crisis because the company "was the first to set out, in the nineteen-nineties, to persuade the American medical establishment that strong opioids should be much more widely prescribed—and that physicians’ longstanding fears about the addictive nature of such drugs were overblown."

In late 2020, the Committee on Oversight and Reform of the US House of Representatives held a hearing on the role of Purdue Pharma and the Sackler family in the opioid epidemic. "We don't agree on a lot on this committee, in a bipartisan way," the ranking member, James Comer of Kentucky said, "but I think our opinion of Purdue Pharma and the actions of your family...are sickening." The Sacklers were also accused of being "addicted to money." Of the Sacklers responses in the hearing, author Patrick Radden Keefe stated "They could produce a rehearsed simulacrum of human empathy" but were "impervious to any genuine moral epiphany." Jim Cooper, a congressman from Tennessee, stated to David Sackler: "Watching you testify makes my blood boil. I am not sure I am aware of any family in America that's more evil than yours." Of the Sacklers' wealth and Richard Sackler's in particular, Keefe states: "No one wanted his money."

In March 2021, Purdue Pharma filed a restructuring plan to dissolve itself and establish a new company dedicated to programs designed to combat the opioid crisis. The proposal was for the Sackler family to pay an additional US$4.2 billion over the next nine years to resolve various civil claims in exchange for immunity from criminal prosecutions. This "legal firewall" was opposed by 24 state attorneys-general, as well as the attorney-general for Washington, D.C. "If the Sacklers are allowed to use bankruptcy to escape the consequences of their actions," said the state AGs who called the proposal legally unprecedented, "it would be a roadmap for other powerful bad actors."

In a bankruptcy court filing on July 7, 2021, multiple states agreed to settle. Though Purdue admitted no wrongdoings, the Sacklers would agree never to produce opioids again and pay billions in damages toward a charitable fund. Purdue Pharma was dissolved on September 1, 2021. The Sacklers agreed to pay $4.5 billion over nine years, with most of that money funding addiction treatment. The bankruptcy judge Robert Drain acknowledged that the Sacklers had moved money to offshore accounts to protect it from claims, and he said he wished the settlement had been higher.

On December 16, 2021, U.S. District Judge Colleen McMahon ruled that the bankruptcy judge did not have authority to give the Sacklers immunity in civil liability cases. This ruling was overturned on appeal to the United States Court of Appeals for the Second Circuit. This ruling was stayed in August 2023 by the U.S. Supreme Court pending oral argument in December 2023. On June 27, 2024, in its decision Harrington v. Purdue Pharma L.P., the U.S. Supreme Court overturned the settlement in a 5–4 decision. On January 23, 2025, the Sackler family and Purdue settled the lawsuit they faced, in a $7.4 billion deal with states and individuals. The family agreed to pay $6.5 billion over 15 years, while Purdue agreed on $900 million in settlements.

== In media ==
The Sackler family has been profiled in various media, including the documentary Crime of the Century on HBO, the book Empire of Pain by Patrick Radden Keefe, the 2021 Hulu miniseries Dopesick, the 2022 Oscar-nominated documentary All the Beauty and the Bloodshed, and the 2023 Netflix mini-series Painkiller.
