= Micah Fitzerman-Blue =

American screenwriter, director and producer

- Education: Harvard College (BA)
- Occupations: Screenwriter; television writer; film producer; television producer; television director

Micah Fitzerman-Blue is an American screenwriter, director and producer. He is best known for his work on Maleficent: Mistress of Evil, A Beautiful Day in the Neighborhood and Painkiller. He also provided additional literary material for Haunted Mansion (2023).
