= Richard Sackler =

American billionaire (born 1945)

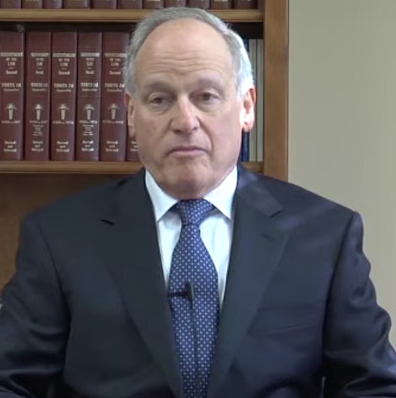
- Sackler in 2015
- Born: Richard Stephen Sackler; March 10, 1945 (age 81); Roslyn, New York, US
- Education: Columbia University (BA); New York University (MD)
- Occupation: Businessman
- Known for: Former chairman and president of Purdue Pharma
- Spouse: Beth Sackler (divorced)
- Children: 3
- Father: Raymond Sackler
- Family: Sackler

Richard Stephen Sackler (born March 10, 1945) is an American businessman, pharmaceutical entrepreneur and physician who was the chairman and president of Purdue Pharma, a now-defunct pharmaceutical company. Under his leadership of Purdue, the company developed the drug OxyContin, an opioid which is widely believed to have spearheaded the opioid epidemic in the United States. Sackler and Purdue's role in the epidemic led to many lawsuits and fines, with the company filing bankruptcy in 2019. The company's demise and unethical marketing tactics and strategies were the subject of the 2021 Hulu miniseries Dopesick and the 2023 Netflix miniseries Painkiller, in which Sackler is portrayed by Michael Stuhlbarg and Matthew Broderick, respectively.

Sackler and his family are also involved in Mundipharma, a United Kingdom-based pharmaceutical company which manufactures similar opioids to those originally designed by Purdue, such as Targin.

== Early life and education ==
Sackler was born in 1945 in Roslyn, New York, the son of Beverly (Feldman) and Raymond Sackler.. He has Jewish ancestry.

He received a bachelor's degree from Columbia College, followed by a M.D. degree from the New York University School of Medicine.

== Career ==
Sackler joined Purdue Pharma in 1971, as assistant to his father, the company's president. He became head of research and development and head of marketing. Sackler was a key figure in the development of Oxycontin, being the moving force behind Purdue Pharma's research around 1990 that pushed Oxycontin to replace MS Contin that was about to have generic competition. Sackler also worked to enlist Russell Portenoy and J. David Haddox into working within the medical community to push a new narrative claiming that opioids were not highly addictive. In pushing Oxycontin through to FDA approval in 1995, Sackler managed to get the FDA to approve a claim that Oxycontin was less addictive than other pain killers, although no studies on how addictive it was or how likely it was to be abused had been conducted as part of the approval process. The addictive nature of opioids has been known for several decades.

Sackler became president in 1999. In 2001, he issued an email to employees of the company urging them to push a narrative that addiction to Oxycontin was caused by the "criminal" addicts who had the addiction, and not caused by anything in the drug itself. Sackler also urged pharmaceutical representatives to urge doctors to prescribe as high doses as possible to increase the company profits.

He was made co-chairman in 2003. Sackler was in charge of the research department that developed OxyContin. As president, he approved the targeted marketing schemes to promote sales of OxyContin to doctors, pharmacists, nurses, academics, and others. Shelby Sherman, an ex-Purdue sales rep, has called these marketing schemes "graft".

In 2008, Sackler, with the knowledge of Mortimer Sackler and Jonathan Sackler, made Purdue Pharma measure its "performance" in proportion to not only the number but also the strength of the doses it sold, despite allegedly knowing that sustained high doses of OxyContin risked serious side effects, including addiction.

8-hour 2015 deposition of Richard Sackler about his family's role in the opioid crisis in the United States.

In 2015, Sackler was deposed by four lawyers in Louisville, Kentucky. The deposition concerned the development and marketing of OxyContin under his watch and that of his family, who were and are active board members of their private company, Purdue Pharma. The marketing and prescribing of OxyContin in Pike County, Kentucky, was of particular interest.

Before the case could go to trial and thus before the deposition could become a matter of public record, Purdue settled for $24 million, admitting no liability, sealing the deposition, and requiring the Kentucky prosecutors to destroy, or return to Purdue, millions of pages of internal documents obtained from the company during discovery. The medical news website STAT then sued to unseal Richard Sackler's deposition. A state judge ruled in its favor. Purdue appealed, but the deposition was later made public.

In 2018, the State of Massachusetts sued Richard Sackler, Purdue Pharma, and 15 other Purdue Pharma executives and Sackler family members alleging they misled doctors and patients about the risks of its opioid-based pain medications in order to boost sales and to keep patients away from safer alternatives. Richard Sackler wrote, "We have to hammer on the abusers in every way possible. They are the culprits and the problem. They are the reckless criminals," in an email regarding the Massachusetts court filing.

In January 2019, The New York Times confirmed that Sackler told company officials in 2008 to "measure our performance by Rx's by strength, giving higher measures to higher strengths." This was verified again with legally obtained documents tied to a new lawsuit, which was filed in June by the Massachusetts attorney general, Maura Healey, and claims that Purdue Pharma and members of the Sackler family knew that putting patients on high dosages of OxyContin for long periods increased the risks of serious side effects, including addiction. Nonetheless, they promoted higher dosages because stronger pain pills brought the company and the Sacklers the most profit, the lawsuit has charged. In addition, on February 1, 2019, unredacted documents were released by AG Healey showing the Sacklers were directing doctors to over-prescribe the drug and encourage medicating strategy under the code name "Region Zero", that details a list of doctors who prescribed inordinately large amounts of Oxycontin for no true medical reason, but rather for the directly related profit of the Sackler family.

== Personal life ==
Sackler was married to Beth Sackler but is now divorced; they have three children. They have a charitable foundation, the Richard and Beth Sackler Foundation. Since 2013, he has lived outside of Austin, Texas.

== In popular culture ==
Sackler was portrayed by Michael Keaton, Bryan Cranston, Michael K. Williams and Richard Kind in a 2019 Last Week Tonight with John Oliver segment on Opioid addiction, by Michael Stuhlbarg in the 2021 Hulu series Dopesick and by Matthew Broderick in the 2023 Netflix limited series Painkiller.

== See also ==
- Sackler family
