= Arthur M. Sackler =

American physician and executive (1913–1987)

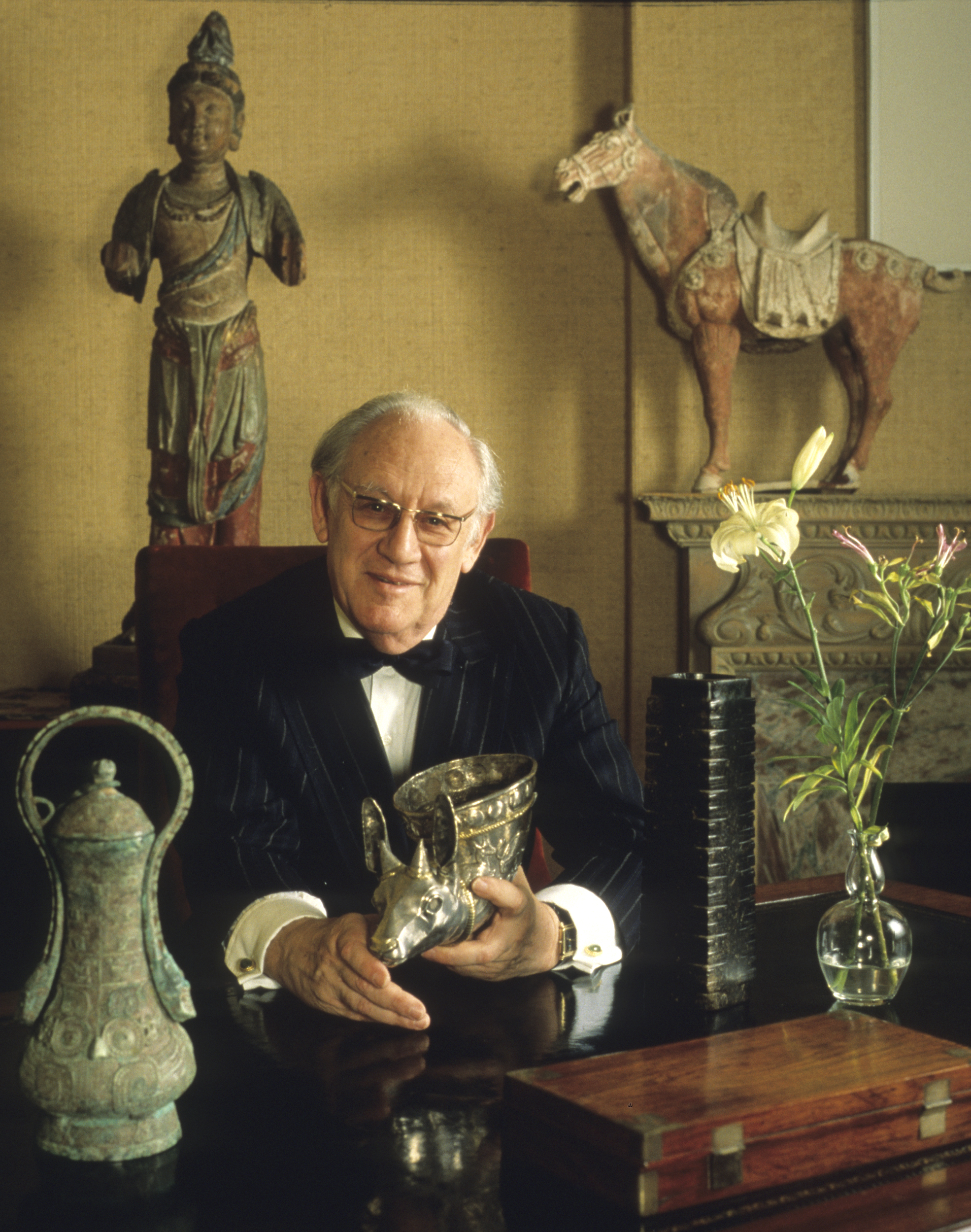
- Born: Arthur Mitchell Sackler; August 22, 1913; New York City, U.S.
- Died: May 26, 1987 (aged 73); New York City, U.S.
- Education: New York University (MD)
- Spouses: Else Finnich Jorgensen; Marietta Lutze; Jillian Tully
- Children: 4, including Elizabeth
- Relatives: Mortimer Sackler (brother); Raymond Sackler (brother)
- Family: Sackler

Arthur Mitchell Sackler (August 22, 1913 – May 26, 1987) was an American psychiatrist and marketer of pharmaceuticals whose fortune originated in medical advertising, profits from drug sales, and trade publications. He was also an art collector. He was one of the three patriarchs of the Sackler family.

Sackler amassed the largest personal Chinese art collection in the world, which he donated to the Smithsonian. He provided the funds needed to build numerous art galleries and schools of medicine. Sackler's estate was estimated at $140 million.

Since his death, Sackler's reputation has been tarnished due to his company Purdue Pharma's central role in the opioid crisis. Many of the museums and galleries that Sackler donated to have distanced themselves from him and his family in the wake of the opioid crisis and the Sackler family's resulting reputational fall. On December 9, 2021, the Metropolitan Museum of Art in New York City officially removed the Sackler family name from galleries which had been named after them.

== Early life and education ==
Arthur Sackler was born Abraham Sackler in Brooklyn, New York, to Isaac and Sophie (née Greenberg) Sackler. He was the eldest of three sons. His parents were Jewish grocers who came to New York from Galicia, then in Austria-Hungary, and now split between Ukraine and Poland. Sackler graduated from Erasmus Hall High School. In The New Yorker, Patrick Radden Keefe called him a polymath for his varied interests. He attended New York University School of Medicine and graduated with an M.D. Sackler paid his tuition by working as a copywriter in 1942 at William Douglas McAdams, an ad agency specializing in medicine, a company that he would buy in 1947 and revolutionize. He also studied sculpture at the Educational Alliance and art history classes at Cooper Union.

== Psychiatry ==
Sackler completed his residency in psychiatry at the Creedmoor Psychiatric Center. From 1949 to 1954, he was director of research at Creedmoor Institute for Psychobiological Studies. He specialized in biological psychiatry. Sackler collaborated on hundreds of papers based on neuroendocrinology, psychiatry, and experimental medicine. He was said to be the first physician to use ultrasound as a diagnostic tool. All three brothers studied in Scotland, became psychiatrists, and joined the research staff at Creedmoor. They had a friend and collaborator, director Johan H. W. Van Ophuijsen, who was described by Arthur Sackler as "Freud's favorite disciple."

In 1951, the three brothers and Van Ophuijsen published a summary of their work, which became known as the "Sackler method." Human subject research, which was stopped for the most part after World War II, did not yet have the oversight of the Nuremberg Code and later the Declaration of Helsinki and the Belmont Report. The Sacklers sought to find a substitute for what could be relatively intrusive electroconvulsive therapy (ECT). They treated with histamine persons who had schizophrenia, persons who had bipolar disorder then termed manic depression, and persons with involutional psychosis, now an unrecognized illness somewhat like depression. Patients were given injections of histamine of increasing strength for up to 24 days. The treatment caused their blood pressure to drop; when their blood pressure recovered, they were given a stronger dose, until blood pressure reached 60/0 mm Hg. Some patients received combination treatments of histamine coupled with insulin or ECT.

== Art collection ==
Sackler and his wife Else began collecting art in the 1940s, shortly after his graduation from NYU. Initially they were attracted to contemporary artists like Marc Chagall but later also collected Renaissance majolica and Post-Impressionist and School of Paris paintings. He considered himself "more of a curator than collector" who preferred acquiring collections to individual pieces. His collection was composed of tens of thousands of works including Chinese, Indian, and Middle Eastern art as well as Renaissance and pre-Columbian pieces. In a speech at Stony Brook University in New York, he discussed his idea that art and science were "interlinked in the humanities".

A small Chinese table in a New York furniture dealer put Chinese art into focus for Sackler who thought, "that here was an esthetic not commonly appreciated or understood." Following the Chinese Civil War, exporters cashed out their holdings and young collectors like Sackler were fortunate to be good targets. He amassed tens of thousands of objects in his life, representing wide and varied interests—Shang dynasty oracle bones, Achaemenid vessels from Iran, and South Asian temple sculpture from the tenth to fourteenth century. Some works are of exhibition quality and some are more appropriate for studies.

He later gave money quarterly to psychiatrist Paul Singer, another enthusiastic collector of Chinese works, who did not have funds but whose taste Sackler trusted. The one string attached to the gift was that upon Singer's death, his collection would be given to a Sackler gallery. In 1997, while cataloguing the collection for acquisition, the Smithsonian museum staff determined that 160 documented objects were missing from Dr. Singer's residence at the time of his death. Most of the lost collection has not been recovered to this day.

== Marketing ==
In the early 1940s he joined medical advertising agency William Douglas McAdams Inc., where he remained active until his death. Sackler transformed the agency with sales techniques hitherto unknown to pharmaceutical manufacturers. A Harvard University historian wrote in 2019 that the Sacklers did not invent direct sales to physicians but they were a pioneering influence. Arthur Sackler marketed in publications targeting physicians directly which increased the pace at which doctors learned about medicines and brought them to market, but did not ever participate in sales force canvassing and detailing, a technique now under tremendous scrutiny.

The Medical Advertising Hall of Fame wrote in 1998,

"No single individual did more to shape the character of medical advertising than the multi-talented Dr. Arthur Sackler. His seminal contribution was bringing the full power of advertising and promotion to pharmaceutical marketing."

With Sackler's help, the pharmaceutical giant Pfizer, previously a chemical manufacturer, began its business in prescription drugs. In 1950, Pfizer had 8 salesmen and expanded that force to 2000 in 1957. Between 1950 and 1956, with Sackler's guidance, Pfizer competed in the new antibiotic marketplace with Terramycin.

Through direct marketing to physicians during the 1960s, he popularized dozens of medicines including Betadine, Senaflax, Librium, and Valium. He became a publisher and started a weekly medical newspaper in 1960, the Medical Tribune, which eventually reached six hundred thousand physicians (by some reports his audience was a million physicians in 20 countries). Sackler's marketing of Valium in journals like Medical Tribune helped to make it the first drug to generate $100 million in sales, and by 1971, Librium and Valium earned $2 billion for his client, Hoffmann-La Roche. As a result of his success, many other drug companies began marketing their drugs in a similar fashion.

== Later career ==
Sackler is credited with helping to racially integrate New York City's first blood banks.

He was editor of the Journal of Clinical and Experimental Psychobiology from 1950 to 1962.

Sackler had somewhat unusual overlapping businesses and developed silent partnerships with the L. W. Frolich ad agency and MD Publications owned by his friends.

In 1958, Sackler established the Laboratories for Therapeutic Research. He was director of the facility until 1983. Sackler also served as chairman of the board of Medical Press, Inc. and president of Physicians News Service, Inc., as well as the Medical Radio and TV Institute, Inc. He served on the board of trustees of New York Medical College where he also held a position as a research professor of psychiatry.

In 1981, Sackler served as vice-chairman of the first international conference on nutrition held in Tianjin, China. He joined the board of directors of Scientific American in 1985. In 1985, Linus Pauling dedicated his book How to Live Longer and Feel Better to him. In 1997, Arthur was posthumously inducted into the Medical Advertising Hall of Fame.

== Philanthropy ==
Sackler built and contributed to many scientific institutions, throughout the 1970s and 1980s. His notable contributions included:

- The Sackler School of Medicine at Tel Aviv University (1972, name removed in 2023)
- The Sackler Institute of Graduate Biomedical Science (now the Vilcek Institute of Graduate Biomedical Sciences) at New York University (1980)
- The Arthur M. Sackler Science Center at Clark University (1985)
- The Sackler School of Graduate Biomedical Sciences (now the Graduate School of Biomedical Sciences) at Tufts University (1980)
- The Arthur M. Sackler Center for Health Communications, also at Tufts University (1986)

Sackler donated drawings and paintings by the Italian architect and engraver Giovanni Battista Piranesi to Avery Library at Columbia University in the early 1970s.

He founded galleries at the Metropolitan Museum of Art where the Sackler Wing houses the Temple of Dendur, and Princeton University, the Arthur M. Sackler Museum at Harvard University in Cambridge, Massachusetts, and the Arthur M. Sackler Museum of Art and Archaeology. In 1987, the Arthur M. Sackler Gallery of the Smithsonian Institution, in Washington, D.C. was opened months after his death, with a gift of $4 million and 1,000 original artworks. Sackler's collection that was donated to the Smithsonian was considered the largest personal collection of ancient Chinese art in the world according to Wen Fong of the Metropolitan Museum of Art. Following his death, The Jillian and Arthur M. Sackler Wing of Galleries was opened at the Royal Academy of Arts, and the Arthur M. Sackler Museum of Art and Archaeology opened at Peking University in 1993.

=== Philanthropy backlash ===
The Sackler family name, and Arthur Sackler's name, saw increased scrutiny in the late 2010s over the family's association with OxyContin. David Crow, writing in the Financial Times, described the family name as "tainted" (cf. tainted donors).

In March 2019, the National Portrait Gallery and the Tate galleries announced that they would not accept further donations from the Sackler family. This came after the American photographer Nan Goldin threatened to withdraw a planned retrospective of her work in the National Portrait Gallery if the gallery accepted a £1 million donation from a Sackler fund. In June 2019, NYU Langone Medical Center announced they will no longer be accepting donations from any Sacklers, and have since changed the name of the Sackler Institute of Graduate Biomedical Sciences to the Vilcek Institute of Graduate Biomedical Sciences.

Later in 2019, the American Museum of Natural History, and the Solomon R. Guggenheim Museum and Metropolitan Museum of Art in New York, each announced they will not accept future donations from any Sacklers that were involved in Purdue Pharma.

According to The New York Times, the Louvre in Paris was the first major museum to "erase its public association" with the Sackler family name. On July 16, 2019, the museum had removed the plaque at the gallery entrance about Sacklers’ donations made to the museum. Throughout the gallery, grey tape covered signs such as Sackler Wing, including signage for the Louvre's Persian and Levantine artifacts collection, which was removed on July 8 or 9. Signage for the collection had identified it as the Sackler Wing of Oriental Antiquities since 1997.

On December 9, 2021, the Metropolitan Museum of Art in New York City, along with the Sackler family, announced the removal of the Sackler family name from seven named galleries, including the wing that houses the iconic Temple of Dendur.

The family's philanthropy has been characterized as "reputation laundering" from profits acquired from the selling of opiates.

== Personal life ==
Sackler was married three times. His first wife was Else Finnich Jorgensen from Denmark; they married in 1934, had two children, and divorced. His second wife was Marietta Lutze (1919–2019), co-owner of DR. KADE Pharmazeutische Fabrik GmbH, whom he married in 1949. They had two children and divorced in 1980 after 25 years of marriage. His last wife, whom he met in 1967, and to whom he was married from 1980 until his death in 1987, was Jillian Sackler (née Gillian Lesley Tully, 1940–2025). She directed philanthropic projects in his name through the Dame Jillian Sackler and Arthur M. Sackler Foundation for the Arts, Sciences and Humanities until her death in 2025.

Sackler had four children—Carol Master and Elizabeth Sackler from his first marriage, and Arthur F. Sackler and Denise Marika from the second.

He lived on Fifth Avenue in New York. Sackler died of a heart ailment at Presbyterian Hospital in New York City on May 26, 1987, at the age of 73.

== Awards and honors ==
Sackler received honorary doctorates from Clark University, Hahnemann University, Tufts University, and Mount Sinai School of Medicine. He was a member of the American Academy of Arts and Sciences and was awarded the Egyptian Order of Merit. He and his wife Jillian endowed the Arthur M. Sackler Colloquia which are held at the National Academy of Sciences.

== Purdue Pharma controversy ==
In 1952, Sackler arranged financing for his brothers to purchase the Purdue-Frederick Company. Purdue came to sell practical over-the-counter products like the antiseptic Betadine, the laxative Senokot, and earwax remover Cerumenex. The company also sold MS Contin, or morphine with time-release properties, for which the patent was to expire in the late 1980s. Following Arthur's death in 1987, his option on one third of that company was sold by his estate to his brothers Mortimer and Raymond, who owned the separate company named Purdue Pharma and used Purdue-Frederick as a holding company.

Eight years after Arthur's death, Purdue began selling OxyContin, about 1.5 times the strength of morphine, under the direction of his brothers. That company pleaded guilty in 2007 and was fined $640 million for misbranding OxyContin. Critics of the Sackler family and Purdue contend that the same marketing techniques used when Arthur consulted to pharmaceutical companies selling non-opioid medications were later abused in the marketing of OxyContin by his brothers and his nephew, Richard Sackler, setting the opioid epidemic in motion. According to Paul Hanly quoted in The Guardian, “This is essentially a crime family … drug dealers in nice suits and dresses.”

== Other controversies ==
Senator Estes Kefauver's subcommittee examined the pharmaceutical industry in 1959. He felt that Arthur Sackler possessed an "integrated" empire of drug discovery and manufacture, drug marketing and advertising, and medical publications explicitly for promoting drug sales. He stopped investigating Sackler in mid-1960. He sponsored the Kefauver Harris Amendment which improved FDA drug oversight in 1962.

Barry Meier wrote in his book Pain Killer that Sackler, "helped pioneer some of the most controversial and troubling practices in medicine: the showering of favors on doctors, the lavish spending on consultants and experts ready to back a drugmaker’s claims, the funding of supposedly independent commercial interest groups, the creation of publications to serve as industry mouthpieces, and the outright exploitation of scientific research for marketing purposes."

Psychiatrist Allen Frances told The New Yorker in 2017, “Most of the questionable practices that propelled the pharmaceutical industry into the scourge it is today can be attributed to Arthur Sackler.” Patrick Radden Keefe, author of the 2017 The New Yorker article later expanded his work into a full-length book Empire of Pain. The book was released in 2021 and was highly critical of the Sackler family, including Arthur Sackler's efforts to hide his numerous conflicts of interest while amassing his fortune.

== See also ==
- Sackler family
- L. W. Frohlich
