= Purdue Pharma =

American pharmaceutical company (1892–2019)

Purdue Pharma L.P.

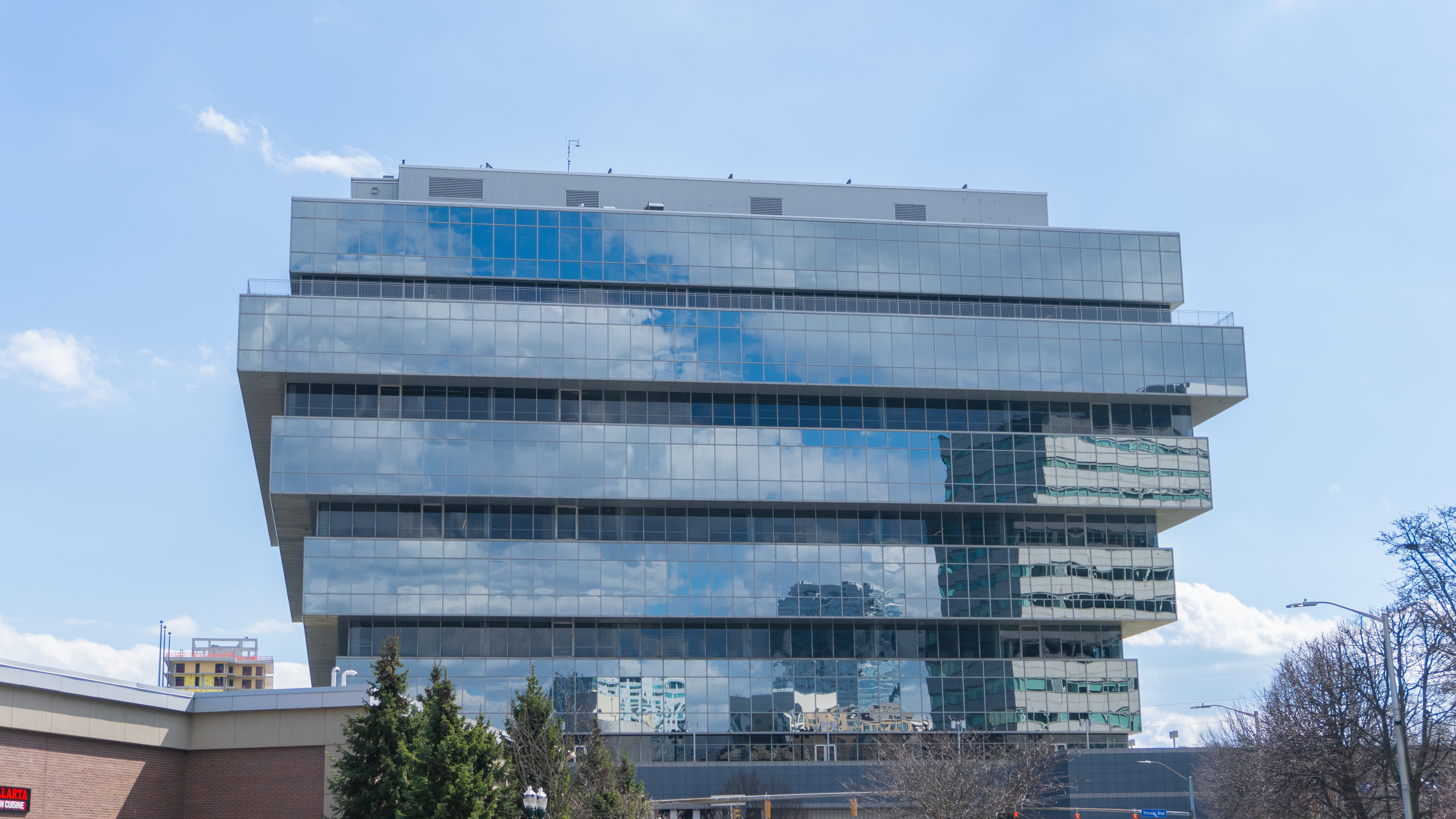
- Headquarters in Stamford, Connecticut
- Type: Private
- Industry: Pharmaceuticals
- Founded: 1892; 134 years ago, in New York, New York, U.S.
- Founders: John Purdue Gray; George Frederick Bingham
- Defunct: 2019
- Fate: Restructuring as Knoa Pharma due to Chapter 11 bankruptcy and legal issues
- Headquarters: Stamford, Connecticut, U.S.
- Key people: Craig Landau (president & CEO); Arthur Sackler; Mortimer Sackler; Raymond Sackler; Richard Sackler (president)
- Number of employees: 5,000 (worldwide)
- Subsidiaries: Rhodes Pharma
- Website: purduepharma.com at the Wayback Machine (archived 2025-10-27)

Purdue Pharma L.P., known from 1892 to 2019 as the Purdue Frederick Company, was an American privately held pharmaceutical company founded by John Purdue Gray. It was sold to Arthur, Mortimer, and Raymond Sackler in 1952, and then owned principally by the Sackler family and their descendants. The company manufactured pain medicines such as hydromorphone, fentanyl, codeine, hydrocodone, and oxycodone (also known by its brand name, OxyContin).

Purdue's marketing of OxyContin was particularly controversial. Although beneficial for cancer related pain, Purdue encouraged doctors to prescribe OxyContin for a broader range of conditions, used misleading claims suggest it's formulation was less addictive than precursor drugs, and boosted prescriptions using financially incentivized sales representatives, paid physician speakers and free educational programmes for doctors. Purdue is also alleged to have encouraged higher dosages despite concerns. Purdue's tactics likely contributed to the American opioid epidemic. Some patients who developed a tolerance turned to street heroin, while others crushed pills to use them recreationally.

Purdue faced a series of lawsuits. In 2007, Purdue paid out one of the largest fines ever levied against a pharmaceutical firm for misleading the public about how addictive the drug OxyContin was compared to other pain medications. In response to the lawsuits, the company shifted its focus to abuse-deterrent formulations, but continued to market and sell opioids as late as 2019 and continued to be involved in lawsuits around the opioid epidemic in the United States.

Purdue filed for Chapter 11 bankruptcy protection on September 15, 2019, in New York City. On October 21, 2020, it was reported that Purdue had reached a settlement potentially worth US$8.3 billion, admitting that it "knowingly and intentionally conspired and agreed with others to aid and abet" doctors dispensing medication "without a legitimate medical purpose." Members of the Sackler family would additionally pay US$225 million and the company would close.

On November 24, 2020, the corporation pleaded guilty to three federal felony charges related to its marketing and sale of Oxycontin, conspiracy to defraud the United States and two charges of conspiracy to violate federal anti-kickback statutes. No executives, employees or members of the Sackler family were charged with any crimes as a part of a deal with the federal government.

Some state attorneys general protested the plan. In March 2021, the United States House of Representatives introduced a bill that would stop the bankruptcy judge in the case from granting members of the Sackler family legal immunity during the bankruptcy proceedings. The House Judicial Committee referred it to the Subcommittee on Antitrust, Commercial, and Administrative Law in October 2021. The bill lapsed at the end of the 117th Congress in January 2023.

As of August 2023, Purdue Pharma remained in chapter 11 bankruptcy, pending a Department of Justice appeal to the United States Supreme Court, of the United States Court of Appeals for the Second Circuit ruling that the bankruptcy proceedings may continue.

On April 28, 2026, U.S. District Judge Madeline Cox Arleo formally sentenced to corporation a settlement valued at $8 billion, inclusive of a $3.5 billion criminal fine and a $2 billion criminal forfeiture. The corporation was ordered to dissolve and will be replaced with a new corporation, focused on the good of the public. While the Sackler family agreed to a multi-billion dollar civil settlement to resolve potential claims, they have consistently maintained they did nothing wrong and have never faced criminal prosecution for the company's actions.

On May 1st, 2026, New York Attorney General Letitia James announced that Purdue Pharma was officially shut down. Knoa Pharma, LLC, which is an independent public benefit corporation and owned by the Knoa Foundation, will take over Purdue Pharma's operations of selling opioid products and address the opioid crisis Purdue Pharma is responsible for spreading.

The company's downfall was the subject of the 2021 Hulu miniseries Dopesick (inspired by the book of the same name), the 2021 HBO film The Crime of the Century, the 2023 Netflix series Painkiller, and several documentaries and books.

== History ==
The company that became Purdue Pharma was founded in 1892 by medical doctors John Purdue Gray and George Frederick Bingham in New York City as the Purdue Frederick Company. The company made a tonic compound made with sherry and glycerin. Sixty years later, in 1952, the company was sold to three other medical doctors, brothers Arthur Mitchell Sackler, Raymond Sackler KBE, and Mortimer David Sackler KBE, who relocated the business to Yonkers, New York. The brothers all held a one-third share in the company, but Arthur's share passed to his brothers after his death in 1987. Mortimer died in 2010, followed by Raymond in 2017. Under the Sacklers, the company opened additional offices in New Jersey and Connecticut. The headquarters are located in Stamford, Connecticut.

The modern company, Purdue Pharma L.P., was incorporated in 1991 and focused on pain management medication, calling itself a "pioneer in developing medications for reducing pain, a principal cause of human suffering". In 1984, its extended-release formulation of morphine, MS Contin was released. OxyContin was released in 1996 after Curtis Wright, an employee of the Food and Drug Administration approved its use on a 12-hour dosage cycle. Starting in 1998, Purdue Pharma secured longterm deals with several Johnson & Johnson companies to supply the raw materials for their opioid products. Around the time of OxyContin's release, the American Pain Society introduced its "pain as fifth vital sign" campaign. Veterans Health Administration adopted the campaign as its national pain management strategy.

In September 2015, the company's website said it had some 1,700 people on its payroll. That same month, the company announced it would acquire VM Pharma in the process gaining access to worldwide development and commercial rights to an allosteric selective tropomyosin receptor kinase inhibitor program, i.e., the Phase II candidate VM-902A. The deal could have generated more than US$213 million for VM Pharma.

=== Financial worth ===
OxyContin soon became a blockbuster drug. "Between 1995 and 2001, OxyContin brought in $2.8 billion in revenue for Purdue Pharma." Cumulative revenues had increased to US$31 billion by 2016 and US$35 billion by 2017. All of the company's profits go to Sackler family trusts and entities. According to a 2017 article in The New Yorker, Purdue Pharma is "owned by one of America's richest families, with a collective net worth of thirteen billion dollars". Many US states allege the family is worth more than $13 billion.

==== Philanthropy ====
In 2016, Forbes magazine listed the Sacklers as one of the 20 wealthiest families in the U.S. and noted that the Sacklers have contributed money to museums, universities and cultural institutions around the world. However, the Purdue website makes little mention of anyone in the Sackler family or their ownership of the company. Allen Frances, former chair of psychiatry at Duke University School of Medicine, said: "Their name has been pushed forward as the epitome of good works and of the fruits of the capitalist system. But, when it comes down to it, they've earned this fortune at the expense of millions of people who are addicted. It's shocking how they have gotten away with it."

== Structure ==
The company's branches include Purdue Pharma L.P., The Purdue Frederick Company, Purdue Pharmaceutical Products L.P., and Purdue Products L.P. Its manufacturing takes place at three sites: Purdue Pharmaceuticals L.P., a plant located in Wilson, North Carolina; the P.F. Laboratories, Inc., in Totowa, New Jersey; and Rhodes Technologies L.P., in Coventry, Rhode Island. Purdue Pharma L.P. also has research labs in Cranbury, New Jersey. OxyContin is currently distributed throughout the U.S., Canada, and Mexico. Distribution takes place from the P.F. Laboratories in Totowa, New Jersey.

Rhodes Pharmaceuticals is a sister company that was established in Rhode Island in 2007. The company is one of the largest producers of off-patent generic opioids in the US. Sister companies to Purdue that are also controlled by descendants of the Sackler brothers are Napp Pharmaceuticals in the United Kingdom and Mundipharma that are selling opioids globally.

New drugs are being developed under other company names, such as Adlon Therapeutics and Imbrium. Both are based in the same building as their parent company in downtown Stamford and share employees.

== Management ==
Richard Sackler, the son of Raymond Sackler, started work at the company in 1971. He was named president in 1999 and became co-chairman of the board in 2003. Richard oversaw the research department that developed OxyContin and managed the sales and marketing unit.

Craig Landau was appointed CEO on June 22, 2017. He joined Purdue Pharma L.P. in 1999 and was chief medical officer and as vice president of R&D innovation, clinical and medical affairs. In 2013, he was appointed president and CEO of Purdue Pharma (Canada).

In 2018, eight members of the Sackler family were listed as active or former members of the board of directors. Steve Miller became chairman in July 2018. By early 2019, the Sacklers had departed the Purdue Pharma board, leaving a board of five members.

== Potential for abuse ==
Purdue Pharma manufactures pain medicines such as hydromorphone, oxycodone, fentanyl, codeine, and hydrocodone. It makes drugs such as MS Contin, OxyContin, and Ryzolt. In 1972, Contin (a controlled drug-release system) was developed. The most commonly abused medications that the company produces are MS Contin and OxyContin. Both can be abused by crushing, chewing, snorting, or injecting the dissolved product. These ingestion methods create a significant risk to the abuser; they can result in overdose and death. Drug-seeking tactics that addicts undergo to obtain the medication include "doctor shopping", which is visiting a number of different physicians to obtain additional prescriptions and refusal to follow up with appropriate examinations, using "pill mills", and prescriber practices with lax controls. Along with the high potential for abuse among people without prescriptions, there is also a risk for physical dependency and reduced reaction or drug desensitization for patients that are prescribed them. Nevertheless, strong analgesic drugs remain indispensable to patients with severe acute and cancer pain.

== Marketing strategy ==
=== FDA approval ===
The first step in the marketing strategy was to seek approval to sell OxyContin from the Food and Drug Administration. Purdue managed to get it approved in 1995, even though no long-term studies and no assessment of its addictive capabilities had been conducted. Approval to prescribe OxyContin for "moderate to severe pain" was granted by Dr Curtis Wright IV, the medical review officer for the FDA. According to Purdue documents in a review conducted in 2006 by the Justice Department, Wright met with Purdue Pharma representatives in a hotel room near the FDA offices in Rockville, Maryland, between January 31 to February 2, 1995. He allowed the company to help draft his medical officer's review (MOR) of OxyContin for the FDA, which included approving the wording of certain texts to be used in OxyContin's package insert, or label. Wright resigned from the FDA a year later, and was subsequently employed as a consultant at Purdue with a substantially higher salary.

The information label approved by the FDA contained the text "Delayed absorption, as provided by OxyContin tablets, is believed to reduce the abuse liability of a drug." The ambiguous text "is believed to reduce the abuse liability" became a key issue in subsequent lawsuits against Purdue and was quoted in the 2007 felony conviction of the company for criminal misbranding. David Kessler, FDA commissioner at the time, later said of the approval of OxyContin: "No doubt it was a mistake. It was certainly one of the worst medical mistakes, a major mistake."

=== Promotion to doctors ===
OxyContin was systematically marketed as if it had very limited potential for addiction or abuse. Purdue trained its sales representatives to convey to doctors that the risk of addiction from OxyContin was "less than one percent." A related feature of this strategy was that, because of the purported low risk, it could be prescribed as an effective treatment for chronic pain from virtually any condition, not just cancer. This "non-malignant pain market" was a much larger market than that for cancer-related pain, making up 86% of the total opioid market in 1999. Purdue's promotion of OxyContin for the treatment of non–cancer-related pain led to a nearly tenfold increase in prescriptions for less serious pain, from about 670,000 in 1997 to about 6.2 million in 2002.

Purdue enlisted consulting firm McKinsey & Company to decide and implement OxyContin marketing strategies. McKinsey suggested Purdue focus its sales rep visits to the highest-prescribing doctors. Purdue also wooed doctors with free trips to pain-management seminars in vacation destinations. According to a study in the American Journal of Public Health, "more than 5,000 physicians, pharmacists, and nurses attended these all-expenses-paid symposia, where they were recruited and trained for Purdue's national speaker bureau." In a 2017 presentation to members of the Sackler family, McKinsey consultants suggested that Purdue pay pharmaceutical distributors a rebate for every overdose attributed to the pills the distributor sold. Purdue's vice president of sales and marketing expressed hesitation "on the need to turbocharge sales," but Sackler family members and other executives pushed on with the promotion. Sales soared, while more than 450,000 people died. In 2021, McKinsey reached a settlement with the attorneys general of 47 states, the District of Columbia, and five territories to pay $537 million and to agree not to work with certain narcotics manufacturers. Kevin Sneader, the McKinsey's global managing partner, stated, "With this agreement, we hope to be part of the solution to the opioid crisis in the U.S."

=== 12-hour cycle and withdrawal symptoms ===
Purdue claimed that one dose of OxyContin relieved pain for 12 hours, more than twice as long as generic medications. It was marketed as "smooth and sustained pain control all day and all night" when taken on a 12-hour schedule. However, most patients found it wore off after eight hours or less. A 2016 investigation by the Los Angeles Times reported that in many people OxyContin's 12-hour schedule does not adequately control pain, resulting in withdrawal symptoms including intense craving for the drug. The Los Angeles Times quoted Theodore J. Cicero, a neuropharmacologist at the Washington University School of Medicine in St. Louis who said that when it doesn't last 12 hours, patients can suffer both a return of their underlying pain and "the beginning stages of acute withdrawal." Cicero said. "That becomes a very powerful motivator for people to take more drugs." The Times suggested that this problem gives "new insight into why so many people have become addicted."

=== Purdue's awareness of abuse ===
Purdue was well aware that OxyContin did not provide pain relief for 12 hours even before the drug went to market, but "held fast to the claim of 12-hour relief, in part to protect its revenue [because] OxyContin's market dominance and its high price—up to hundreds of dollars per bottle—hinge on its 12-hour duration." Instead of prescribing small doses more frequently, doctors were advised to keep patients on the 12 hour cycle, but prescribe a stronger dose, thereby exacerbating their addiction.

Reports of OxyContin abuse began to surface at the start of 2000. A proactive abuse surveillance program called Researched Abused, Diversion, and Addiction-Related Surveillance (RADARS) sponsored by Purdue Pharma L.P. pronounced Oxycontin and hydrocodone the most commonly abused pain medications. In 2003, the Drug Enforcement Administration found that Purdue's "aggressive methods" had "very much exacerbated OxyContin's widespread abuse."

In 2012, The New England Journal of Medicine published a study that found that "76 percent of those seeking help for heroin addiction began by abusing pharmaceutical narcotics, primarily OxyContin" and drew a direct line between Purdue's marketing of OxyContin and the subsequent heroin epidemic in the U.S.

According to The New York Times, based on a confidential Justice Department report that was revealed in May 2018, Purdue was also aware of "reports that the pills were being crushed and snorted; stolen from pharmacies; and that some doctors were being charged with selling prescriptions." Over a hundred internal company memos between 1997 and 1999 included the words "street value", "crush", or "snort".

=== The Ogrosky memo ===
In October 2006, Kirk Ogrosky, Deputy Chief of the Fraud Division at the US Department of Justice, wrote an internal memorandum which shows that government prosecutors found evidence that executives at the drugs giant Purdue Pharma may have committed multiple crimes, including wire fraud and money laundering, to boost sales of OxyContin. The document confirms that a $654m settlement between Purdue and the government over deceptive marketing claims in mid-2007 fell far short of what prosecutors had actually sought just six months earlier.

In 2019, Senators Sheldon Whitehouse and Maggie Hassan requested the Justice Department give them a copy of the memo, stating it is "purported to include evidence that Purdue Pharma executives may have lied when they told Congress that they had no knowledge of the extensive abuse and diversion of OxyContin before it was made known to them in 2000". The memo recommends that Purdue executives Michael Friedman, Paul Goldenheim and Howard Udell should have been charged with felonies that could have sent them to prison.

== Oxycontin-related lawsuits ==
By 2019, over 1,000 lawsuits have been initiated against Purdue by state and local governments. States across the USA have filed claims for more than $2 trillion in the Purdue Pharma bankruptcy case.

=== Connecticut ===
In 2001, Connecticut Attorney General Richard Blumenthal issued a statement urging Purdue to take action regarding abuse of OxyContin. He observed that while Purdue seemed sincere, there was little action being taken beyond "cosmetic and symbolic steps". After Purdue announced plans to reformulate the drug, Blumenthal noted that this would take time and that "Purdue Pharma has a moral, if not legal obligation to take effective steps and address addiction and abuse even as it works to reformulate the drug."

=== West Virginia ===
In 2004, the West Virginia Attorney General sued Purdue for reimbursement of "excessive prescription costs" paid by the state. Saying that patients were taking more of the drug than they had been prescribed because the effects of the drug wore off hours before the 12-hour schedule, the state charged Purdue with deceptive marketing. In his ruling the trial judge wrote: "Plaintiff's evidence shows Purdue could have tested the safety and efficacy of OxyContin at eight hours, and could have amended their label, but did not." The case never went to trial; Purdue agreed to settle by paying the state US$10 million (equivalent to approximately $17M in 2025) for programs to discourage drug abuse, with all the evidence remaining under seal and confidential.

=== 2007 guilty plea ===
In May 2007, the company pleaded guilty to misleading the public about OxyContin's risk of addiction and agreed to pay $600 million (equivalent to approximately $932M in 2025) in one of the largest pharmaceutical settlements in U.S. history. The company's president (Michael Friedman), top lawyer (Howard R. Udell), and former chief medical officer (Paul D. Goldenheim) pleaded guilty as individuals to misbranding charges, a criminal violation and agreed to pay a total of US$34.5 million in fines. Friedman, Udell, and Goldenheim agreed to pay US$19 million, US$8 million and US$7.5 million, respectively. In addition, three top executives were charged with a felony and sentenced to 400 hours of community service in drug treatment programs.

=== Kentucky ===
On October 4, 2007, Kentucky officials sued Purdue because of widespread OxyContin abuse in Appalachia. A lawsuit filed by Kentucky then-Attorney General Greg Stumbo and Pike County officials demanded millions in compensation. Eight years later, on December 23, 2015, Kentucky settled with Purdue for $24 million.

=== City of Everett (Washington) ===
In January 2017, the city of Everett, Washington sued Purdue based on increased costs for the city from the use of OxyContin as well as Purdue not intervening when they noted odd patterns of sale of their product, per agreement in the 2007 suit noted above. The allegations say Purdue did not follow legal agreements to track suspicious excess ordering or potential black market usage. The suit says false clinics created by unscrupulous doctors used homeless individuals as 'patients' to purchase OxyContin, then sold it to the citizens of Everett.

The black market sale of the drug out of legal pharmacies based in Los Angeles with distributions points in Everett is also said to be part of the experience of the city according to the suit. No intervention was made by Purdue to contact the DEA for years despite knowing of the practice and the overuse and sale of their product. The suit asks for a yet to be determined reimbursement related to costs of policing, housing, health care, rehabilitation, criminal justice system, park and recreations department, as well as to the loss of life or compromised quality of life of the citizens of Everett directly.

=== Six-state lawsuit ===
In May 2018, six states—Florida, Nevada, North Carolina, North Dakota, Tennessee, and Texas—filed lawsuits charging deceptive marketing practices, adding to 16 previously filed lawsuits by other U.S. states and Puerto Rico. By January 2019, 36 states were suing Purdue Pharma.

=== Massachusetts ===
In 2019, Massachusetts attorney general Maura Healey filed a lawsuit against Purdue Pharma which also claimed eight members of the Sackler family were "personally responsible" for deceptive sales practices and in fact had "micromanaged" a "deceptive sales campaign". In response, the company said there was a "rush to vilify."

Purdue started the OxyContin "Savings Card" program in 2008, with patients receiving discounts on their first five prescriptions. Internal company data showed these discounts led to 60 percent more patients staying on OxyContin for longer than 90 days. The court filing for Massachusetts stated, "Purdue determined that opioid savings cards worked like the teaser rate on a long-term and very high-stakes mortgage."

=== Oklahoma ===
In March 2019, Purdue Pharma reached a $270 million settlement in a lawsuit filed by Oklahoma, which claimed its opioids contributed to the deaths of thousands of people.

== Removal of Sackler name ==
The family's philanthropy has been characterized as reputation laundering from profits acquired from the selling of opiates. In response to the role of Purdue in the opioid crisis, photographer Nan Goldin launched the organization P.A.I.N., to pressure museums and other cultural institutions to divest from Sackler Family philanthropy. As of May 2023, at least 20 institutions have dropped the Sackler name, including the Metropolitan Museum of Art, and Yale University in the USA; and the National Gallery in London. Other institutions have stopped accepting donations from the Sackler family.

A rose cultivar previously named 'Mortimer Sackler' was renamed in 2022 by its breeder, David Austin Roses, to 'Mary Delany'.

== Bankruptcy ==
=== 2019 and 2020 lawsuits and negotiations ===
In August 2019, Purdue Pharma and the Sackler family were in negotiations to settle the claims for a payment of $10-$12 billion. The settlement would include a Chapter 11 filing by Purdue Pharma, which would be restructured as a public beneficiary trust and the Sackler Family would give up any ownership in the company. Addiction treatment drugs currently developed by the company would be given to the public cost-free. All profits of Purdue would henceforth go to the plaintiffs in the case. On top of that, the Sackler family would contribute $3 billion in cash. The family would also sell Mundipharma and contribute another $1.5 billion from the sales proceeds to the settlement. However, the Sackler family would remain a billionaire family and would not be criminally charged for contributing to the opioid crisis. Purdue filed for bankruptcy in White Plains, New York, a few days after reaching this tentative settlement.

However, many states refused the terms of the proposed settlement and vowed to pursue further litigation to recover additional money, much of it alleged to be hidden offshore. States are seeking to hold individual family members personally liable for the costs of the opioid epidemic, regardless of Purdue's bankruptcy. They contend the Sacklers knew litigants would be pursuing Purdue's funds and committed fraudulent conveyance. In September 2019, the office of the New York Attorney General accused the Sackler family of hiding money by wiring at least $1 billion from company accounts to personal accounts overseas. A December 2019 audit from AlixPartners, hired by Purdue for guidance through Chapter 11 restructuring, said the Sacklers withdrew $10.7 billion from Purdue after the company began to receive legal scrutiny.

In October 2020, Purdue agreed to an $8 billion settlement that includes a $2 billion criminal forfeiture, a $3.54 billion criminal fine, and $2.8 billion in damages for its civil liability. It would plead guilty to three criminal charges, and it would become a public benefit company under a trust required to consider American public health. The Sacklers would not be permitted to be involved in the new company.

=== 2021 ===
In 2021, the Sacklers sought a controversial ruling from judge Robert D. Drain to grant them immunity and protect their assets from lawsuits linked to the opioid crisis. The Sacklers were seeking bankruptcy-like protection from the court without actually filing for personal bankruptcy. A number of state attorneys general argued that such a deal would force states to suspend efforts to investigate members of the family and hold them accountable.

In August 2021, US Representatives Carolyn Maloney and Mark DeSaulnier introduced a SACKLER Act to try and prevent people who have not filed for bankruptcy from being released from lawsuits brought by states, municipalities or the U.S. government. Maloney claimed that the Sackler family were using "a loophole in our bankruptcy system to protect their billions of dollars in wealth," and accused the department of Justice of having "been complicit in devising" the settlement plan. As at August 2023, the proposed Act has not passed into law.

In September 2021, the company won approval of a $4.5 billion (US) plan that would legally dissolve the pharmaceutical manufacturer and restructure it into a public benefit corporation focused on addressing the opioid crisis and repaying individuals and families who were damaged by its products. This restructuring would be financed by a settlement with the Sackler family, insurance payments and ongoing business operations and would eliminate the family's exposure to civil litigation. The settlement was overturned in December 2021 by Judge Colleen McMahon of the U.S. District Court for the Southern District of New York, on the basis that the bankruptcy code did not permit a judge to release the Sacklers from civil liability.

=== 2022–2023 bankruptcy settlement ===
In March 2022, U.S. bankruptcy judge Robert Drain approved a settlement involving eight states plus the District of Columbia. Under the terms of the settlement agreement, the Sacklers would be required to pay between $5.5 and $6 billion to a trust that will be used to pay the claims of opioid creditors, including states, victims of addiction, hospitals, and municipalities. The decision would shield the Sacklers from personal civil liability, but not from potential criminal liability.

In May 2023, the U.S. Second Circuit Court of Appeals in New York endorsed the $6 billion settlement, with the Sackler family giving up ownership of Purdue and all profits being sent to a fund to prevent and treat opioid addiction. This ruling reversed the lower court decision and once again, would shield the Sacklers from opioid-related lawsuits despite not personally filing for bankruptcy.

However, on August 10, 2023, the Supreme Court of the United States paused the bankruptcy settlement and agreed to hear an appeal made by the United States Department of Justice as to the legality of the settlement that would shield the Sackler family from civil lawsuits over their role in the opioid epidemic. On June 27, 2024, the Court ruled on the case, Harrington v. Purdue Pharma L.P., deciding in a 5-4 opinion to overturn the settlement and remand the case to the lower court for further review. The majority ruled that the proposed settlement was illegal because the US Bankruptcy Code does not permit granting liability relief to a party, like the Sackler family, that did not file for bankruptcy protection.

== See also ==
- Timeline of the opioid epidemic
- Opioid epidemic in the United States
- Richard Sackler, former chairman and president of Purdue Pharma
- List of things named after the Sackler family, including notes on current status
- The Crime of the Century, two-part documentary
- Empire of Pain, book by Patrick Radden Keefe.
- Dopesick, Hulu TV drama
- The Pharmacist, Netflix documentary series
- Painkiller, Netflix TV drama
