= Mortimer Sackler =

American psychiatrist and entrepreneur (1916–2010)

Mortimer Sackler KBE
- Born: Mortimer David Sackler; December 7, 1916; New York City, U.S.
- Died: March 24, 2010 (aged 93); Gstaad, Switzerland
- Education: University of Glasgow; Middlesex University (Massachusetts) (MD)
- Occupations: Physician and entrepreneur
- Known for: Purdue Pharma
- Spouses: Muriel Lazarus; Gheri Wimmer; Theresa Rowling
- Children: 8
- Relatives: Arthur M. Sackler (brother); Raymond Sackler (brother)
- Family: Sackler

Mortimer David Sackler KBE (December 7, 1916 – March 24, 2010) was an American-born psychiatrist and entrepreneur. He co-owned Purdue Pharma with his brothers Arthur and Raymond, where he oversaw aggressive marketing of OxyContin, which led to an opioid crisis in the United States.

During his lifetime, Sackler's philanthropy included donations to the Metropolitan Museum of Art, the Tate Gallery, the Royal College of Art, the Louvre, and Berlin's Jewish Museum.

Sackler died in Gstaad, Switzerland, in March 2010 at 93.

== Early life ==
Mortimer Sackler was the second son of Jewish immigrants Isaac Sackler, born in what is now Ukraine, and Sophie Greenberg from Poland. His father was a grocer in Brooklyn, where Sackler attended Erasmus Hall High School. He had two brothers; Arthur, the oldest of the three, died in 1987, and Raymond, the youngest, died in 2017.

== Education ==
Sackler attended the Anderson College of Medicine of Glasgow University between 1937 and 1939. Although he was born in New York, he said that he was not accepted by a New York medical school because they had quotas on the number of Jewish students they would accept at that time. He sailed steerage to the United Kingdom. In Glasgow there was a well-established Jewish community that offered him hospitality and supported him while he attended university. Due to the outbreak of World War II, Sackler was prevented from finishing his medical education at this school. He instead obtained an M.D. degree at the Middlesex University School of Medicine in Massachusetts in 1944.

== Early career ==
During the Korean War, Sackler was an army psychiatrist in Denver, Colorado, before joining his brothers, Arthur and Raymond, both newly graduated medical doctors, at the Creedmoor Psychiatric Hospital in New York City. The three "became a moving force in the research and clinical outpatient department at Creedmore, which would become the Creedmore Institute for Psychobiologic Studies". According to The Independent, during the 1950s the brothers "undertook pioneering research into how alterations in bodily function can affect mental illness. This work contributed to a move away from treatments such as electroshock therapy and lobotomy towards pharmaceutical treatment."

== Pharmaceuticals ==
In 1952, Mortimer and Raymond became the co-chairmen of a small Greenwich Village-based pharmaceutical company that Arthur had financed. The Purdue Frederick Company later became the Stamford, Connecticut-based Purdue Pharma. With Raymond, he established pharmaceutical companies in Austria, Canada, Cyprus, Germany, Switzerland, and the UK.

=== Purdue Pharma ===
At the time of Arthur Sackler's death in 1987, Purdue Pharma was a small drug company. In 1996, Purdue introduced its opioid drug, OxyContin. By 2001, eighty percent of Purdue Pharma's revenue came from the sale of OxyContin worth $3 billion. According to The New Yorker, as of 2017, OxyContin, a blockbuster drug, "reportedly generated some $35 billion dollars in revenue for Purdue". Forbes listed the Sackler family as the 19th wealthiest in the United States in 2016 with a fortune of $13 billion. The largest part of the Sackler family's fortune came from the sale of OxyContin. Mortimer served as co-chairman of Purdue Pharma Inc from 1952 until 2007.

== Philanthropy ==
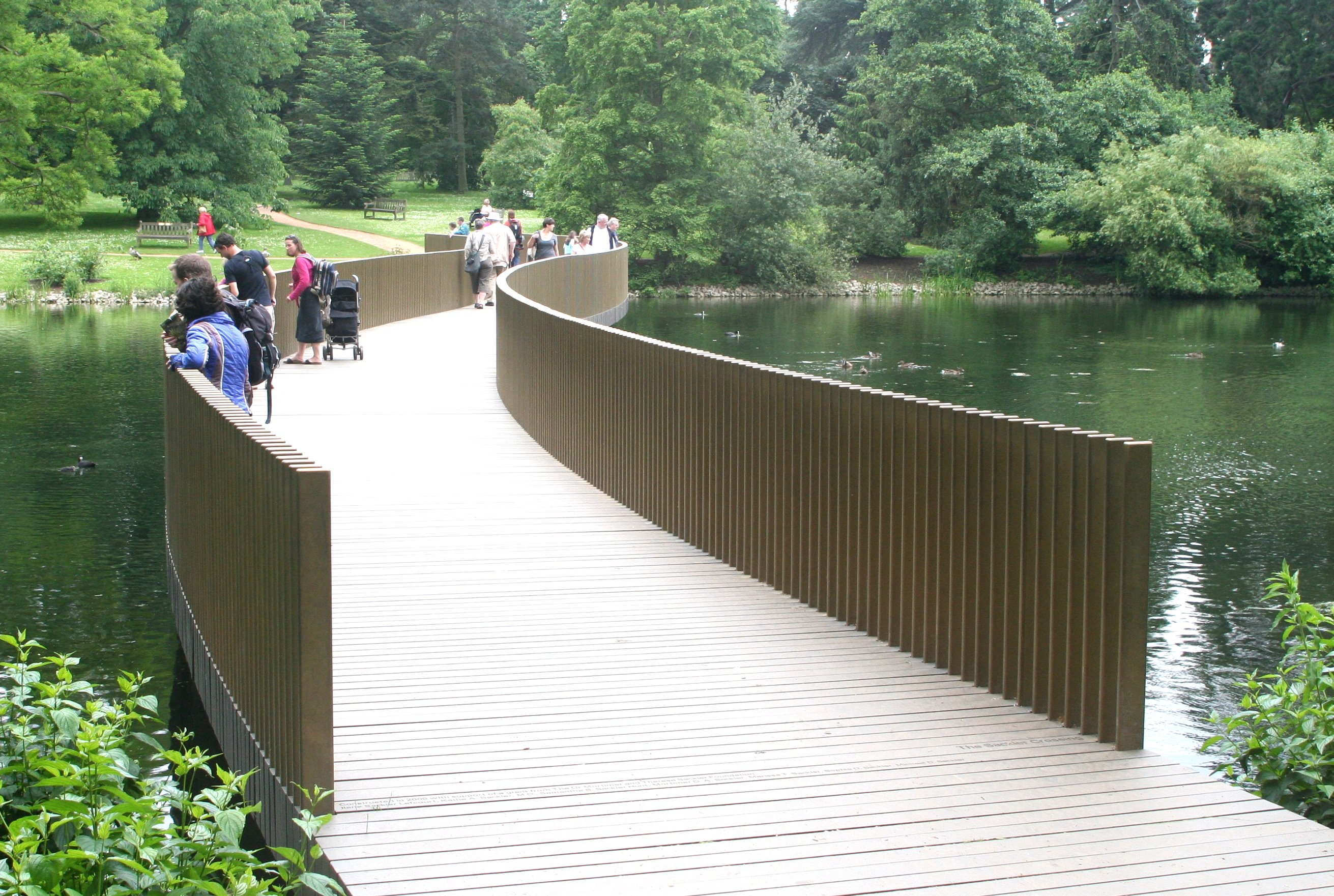
The former Sackler Crossing at Kew Gardens

The Sackler name was displayed at numerous cultural and educational institutions in the United States and in Europe including "Harvard, the Smithsonian and the Sackler Wing at the Metropolitan Museum of Art, the Louvre, the Serpentine Sackler Gallery which opened in 2013, the new forecourt at the Victoria & Albert Museum, a Sackler Crossing – a walkway over the lakebridge at Kew Gardens, the Tate Gallery, the National Gallery, the Royal Opera House and behind research centers at several UK universities." He donated to the Royal College of Art, the Louvre and Berlin's Jewish Museum, He donated to research facilities and professorships at MIT, Columbia, Cornell, Stanford and others in the US, Sackler Library at the University of Oxford, Sackler Laboratories at the University of Reading, Sackler Musculoskeletal Research Centre, University College London, Sackler Institute of Pulmonary Pharmacology at King's College London, Sackler Biodiversity Imaging Laboratory at the Natural History Museum, London. Jointly with his brothers he endowed the Sackler Faculty of Medicine at Tel Aviv University and the Sackler School of Graduate Biomedical Sciences at Tufts University.

Sackler established the Dr Mortimer and Theresa Sackler Foundation jointly with his third wife, Dame Theresa Elizabeth Sackler. The foundation's donations include the Sackler Centre for Consciousness Science at the University of Sussex and a contribution to the Imaging Centre of Excellence at Glasgow's Queen Elizabeth University Hospital, containing Scotland's first 7 tesla MRI.

On December 9, 2021, the Metropolitan Museum of Art in New York City, along with the Sackler family, announced the removal of the Sackler family name from seven named galleries, including the wing that houses the iconic Temple of Dendur.

== Honors ==
In 1995, Sackler was made an Honorary Knight Commander of the Order of the British Empire (KBE) by Queen Elizabeth II in recognition of his services to education.

The 'Mortimer Sackler' rose was named in his honor by his wife, Theresa, after she won the naming rights in a charity auction. However, in 2022, the rose was renamed 'Mary Delany' by David Austin Roses in honor of Mary Delany, an artist known for her paper-cut plant drawings. The registration name of the rose is Ausorts.

== Personal life ==
Sackler married three times. His first wife was Glasgow-born Muriel Lazarus (1917–2009); the couple had three children before divorcing, Ilene Sackler Lefcourt (b. 1948 m. Gerald B. Lefcourt), Kathe A. Sackler, (married to Susan Shack Sackler), and Robert Mortimer Sackler (predeceased). His second wife was Gertraud "Geri" Wimmer; the marriage produced two children before their divorce, Mortimer David Alfons Sackler, and Samantha Sophia Sackler Hunt. In 1980, he married his third wife, Theresa Elizabeth Rowling (b. 1949), from Staffordshire, England who was formerly a teacher at the Sisters of Our Lady of Sion convent in London's Notting Hill Gate. In 2011, Rowling became Dame Theresa Sackler for her work as a philanthropist. The couple had three children, Marissa Sackler, Sophia Sackler (m. Jamie Dalrymple) and Michael Sackler who were raised in London. Theresa was a member of the board of directors of Purdue Pharma.

Sackler lived in London from 1974, when he renounced his American citizenship; he also spent time at his other properties including his estate on the Berkshire Downs, Rooksnest, Lambourn Woodlands, Berkshire with nineteen acres of ornate gardens by designer Arabella Lennox-Boyd (Note: A cited in Mortimer Sackler's obituary in The Sunday Times, In 2002, as part of a charity auction she named a new rose cultivar bred by David Austin, after Mortimer, because of the quality of giving the "impression of delicacy and softness but are, in fact, very tough and little affected by bad weather".) and in their residences in the Swiss Alps, and the French Riviera.

According to a February 13, 2018, article in The Guardian, Mortimer Sackler had seven surviving children, three of whom were on the board of directors of the company he co-founded, Purdue Pharma—Ilene Sackler, Kathe A. Sackler, and Mortimer David Alfons Sackler, (b. 1972) and four who are not—Samantha Sophia Sackler Hunt, Marissa Sackler, Sophie Sackler, and Michael Sackler.

== Death ==
Sackler died at age 93 on March 24, 2010, in Gstaad, Switzerland, survived by his wife and their son and two daughters, as well as four children from his previous two marriages.

== Involvement in the opioid crisis ==
On October 30, 2017, The New Yorker published a multi-page exposé on Mortimer Sackler, Purdue Pharma, and the entire Sackler family. The article links Raymond and Arthur Sackler's business acumen with the rise of direct pharmaceutical marketing and eventually to the rise of addiction to OxyContin in the United States. The article implies that Sackler bears some moral responsibility for the opioid epidemic in the United States. In 2019, The New York Times ran a piece confirming that Sackler told company officials in 2008 to measure the company's performance in proportion not only to the number of drug doses it sold, but also to the strength of those doses. This was verified again with legally obtained documents tied to a new lawsuit, which was filed in June by the Massachusetts attorney general, Maura Healey. The Times reported that the lawsuit claims Purdue Pharma and members of the Sackler family "knew that putting patients on high dosages of OxyContin for long periods increased the risks of serious side effects, including addiction. Nonetheless, they promoted higher dosages because stronger pain pills brought the company and the Sacklers the most profit".

== See also ==
- Sackler family

== Sources ==
- The Times: Obituary (subscription required)
