= Raymond Sackler =

American physician and businessman (1920–2017)

Raymond Sackler KBE
- Born: February 16, 1920; New York City, U.S.
- Died: July 17, 2017 (aged 97); Greenwich, Connecticut, U.S.
- Education: New York University (BS); Middlesex University (MD)
- Occupations: Physician and entrepreneur
- Known for: Purdue Pharma
- Spouse: Beverly Feldman
- Children: 2, including Richard
- Relatives: Arthur M. Sackler (brother); Mortimer Sackler (brother)
- Family: Sackler

Raymond Sackler KBE (February 16, 1920 – July 17, 2017) was an American physician and businessman. He acquired Purdue Pharma together with his brothers Arthur M. Sackler and Mortimer Sackler. Purdue Pharma is the developer of OxyContin, the drug at the center of the opioid epidemic in the United States.

Sackler and his family have been linked to the rise of direct pharmaceutical marketing and the opioid crisis. The Sackler family's philanthropy has been characterized as reputation laundering from profits acquired from the selling of opiates.

== Early life ==
Born in Brooklyn, New York, in 1920 to a Jewish family, Sackler was educated at Erasmus High School and attended New York University, where he received a bachelor's degree in 1938. Due to Jewish quotas imposed by the major U.S. medical schools during that era, he started his medical education at Anderson College of Medicine in Glasgow, Scotland, which he attended from 1938 to 1940.

When World War II began, he stayed in Scotland and volunteered in the British Home Guard, and he also served as a plane spotter. He returned to the U.S. and completed his studies at Middlesex University School of Medicine (a school on the site of the present-day Brandeis University in Waltham, Massachusetts), where he received his MD degree in 1944.

Sackler married Beverly Feldman in 1944. They had two sons, Richard S. Sackler and Jonathan D. Sackler. Beverly Sackler died on October 15, 2019, at the age of 95.

== Career ==
=== Medical career ===
Sackler was certified by the American Board of Psychiatry and Neurology (P) in 1957, and was a Life Fellow of the American Psychiatric Association. Sackler, with his two brothers, Arthur and Mortimer, co-founded the Creedmoor Institute for Psychobiological Studies in New York City, where they engaged in research in the psycho-biology of schizophrenia and manic depressive psychosis.

They received two awards from the Medical Society of the State of New York: the First Award for Scientific Research; and one year later, Honorable Mention for Scientific Research. In 1998, Sackler was awarded a Doctor of Law Honoris Causa from the University of Cambridge.

=== Pharmaceutical business ===
With lessons learned in research, Sackler and his brother Mortimer transitioned into the development of numerous pharmaceutical, manufacturing, and research companies, Sackler being closely associated with the now global reach of Purdue Pharma in the United States and Canada and Mundipharma, Ltd. in Europe, Asia, and Africa.

Purdue Pharma, which is 100% privately owned and operated by the families of Raymond and Mortimer Sackler, researched, developed, markets and distributes the opiate drug Oxycontin and related compounds.

A year prior to his death, Sackler was estimated by Forbes to have a net worth of around $13 billion.

=== Contribution to the US opioid epidemic ===
On October 30, 2017, The New Yorker published a multi-page exposé on Raymond Sackler, Purdue Pharma, and the Sackler family. The article links Raymond and Arthur Sackler's business acumen with the rise of direct pharmaceutical marketing and eventually to the rise of addiction to OxyContin in the United States. The article implies that Raymond Sackler bears moral responsibility for the opioid epidemic in the United States.

In 2019, the New York Times revealed that Sackler had told company officials in 2008 to "measure our performance by Rx’s by strength, giving higher measures to higher strengths." This was verified by legally obtained documents tied to a new lawsuit filed in June 2018 by the Massachusetts attorney general, Maura Healey. The lawsuit claims that Purdue Pharma and members of the Sackler family knew that putting patients on high dosages of OxyContin for long periods increased the risks of serious side effects, including addiction. Nonetheless, they promoted higher dosages because stronger pain pills brought the company and the Sacklers the most profit. On February 1, 2019, Healey released unredacted documents showing that the Sacklers directed doctors to overprescribe the drug and listed doctors (under the code name "Region Zero") who overprescribed Oxycontin for the Sackler family's profit rather than patients' health.

== Philanthropy ==
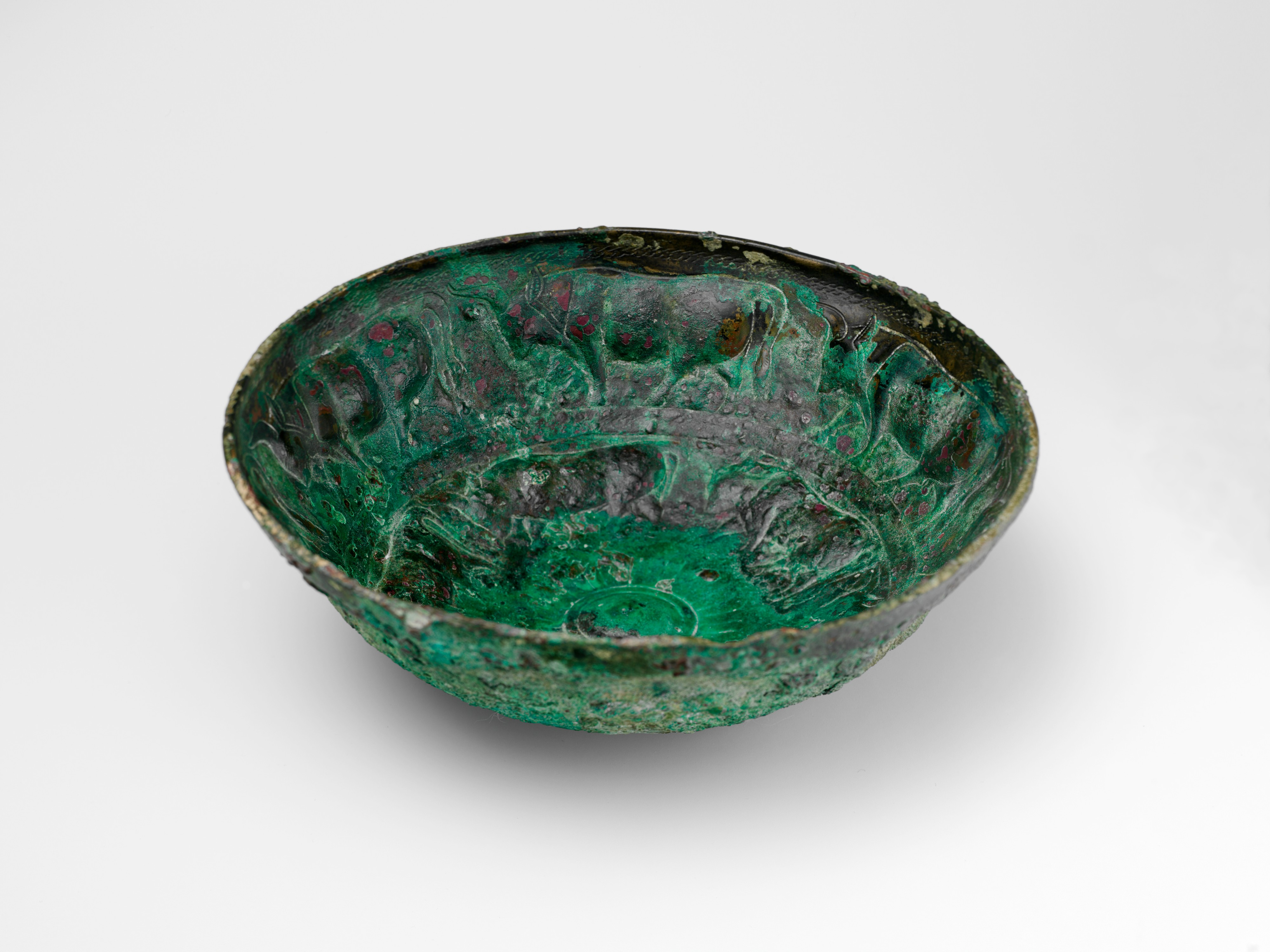
ca. 8th–7th century B.C bronze bowl with bands of striding bulls and two inscriptions, donated by Sackler to the Metropolitan Museum of Art

Sackler and his wife, Beverly, directly and through the Raymond and Beverly Sackler Foundations, initiated and sustained major research programs in the biomedical, biological, physical and engineering sciences through endowments. In support of the arts, the Sacklers were recognized by the British Museum (Raymond and Beverly Sackler Wing, the Ancient Near East and Egypt), the Louvre, and, together with his two brothers, the Sackler Wing (former) at the Metropolitan Museum of Art, New York City, which houses the Temple of Dendur and study centers for Chinese and Japanese Art History. Many institutions have since distanced themselves from the family.

Together with his brothers, in 1980 Sackler established doctoral educational programs at two US Universities: the Sackler School of Graduate Biomedical Sciences at Tufts University and the Sackler Institute of Graduate Biomedical Sciences at New York University School of Medicine. He and his wife Beverly established the Raymond and Beverly Sackler Medical Research Centre at the University of Cambridge School of Clinical Medicine (UK) and were sponsors at that medical school of the MD/PhD Program and a new cancer research program.

The Sackler Faculty of Medicine at Tel Aviv University, sponsored conjointly with Sackler's two brothers in 1964, includes the Sackler School of Medicine, the Maurice and Gabriel Goldschleger School of Dental Medicine and the Sackler Institute of Molecular Medicine. These names were removed in 2023. Still, the university's Faculty of Exact Sciences and School of Physics and Astronomy are named after Raymond and Beverly Sackler. Tel Aviv University also serves as the institutional sponsor of two prizes endowed by Sackler and his wife Beverly: The International Prize in Physical Sciences and The International Prize in Biophysics.

At Leiden University in the Netherlands, Sackler supported the Laboratory for Astrophysics named after him. He also gave Leiden University an endowment for the establishment of the Raymond and Beverly Chair of American History. Sackler was the moving force, one of the founders, and oversaw the implementation of the Sackler School of Medicine New York State / American Program chartered by the New York State Board of Regents that provides a four-year medical education program for American students at the Sackler School of Medicine of the Sackler Faculty of Medicine at Tel Aviv University.

In 2010, the Foundation established The Raymond and Beverly Sackler Foundation Science Fund in honor of Ralph J. Cicerone, at the National Academy of Sciences (USA) was established to provide support of scientific programs independent of governmental requests/funding.

In 2011, it established The Raymond and Beverly Sackler Distinguished Lecture Series in Neuroscience was established at Cardiff University.

On December 9, 2021 the Metropolitan Museum of Art in New York City, along with the Sackler family, announced the removal of the Sackler family name from seven named galleries, including the wing that houses the iconic Temple of Dendur. In 2022, the British Museum announced that it would rename the Raymond and Beverly Sackler Rooms and the Raymond and Beverly Sackler Wing, as part of "development of the new masterplan", and that it "made this decision together through collaborative discussions" with the Sackler Foundation.

== See also ==
- Sackler family
