= Cambridge Consultants =

British technology consultancy

- Type: Subsidiary
- Founded: 1960; 66 years ago
- Founders: Tim Eiloart; Rodney Dale; David Southward
- Headquarters: Cambridge Science Park, Cambridge, United Kingdom
- Area served: Worldwide
- Key people: Richard Traherne (chief executive)
- Services: Product development; Technology consultancy
- Number of employees: 740 (2025)
- Parent: Capgemini
- Website: cambridgeconsultants.com

Cambridge Consultants is a British product development and technology consultancy based on the Cambridge Science Park. Founded in 1960, it was one of the first technology-transfer companies in the UK. Companies spun out of it include Domino Printing Sciences, Xaar, Cambridge Silicon Radio and Alphamosaic.

A venture into manufacturing put the company into receivership in 1970, and Arthur D. Little took it over the next year. After Arthur D. Little filed for bankruptcy in 2002, Cambridge Consultants' managers bought the company with backing from Altran, which became its owner. Capgemini acquired Altran in 2020, and in 2021 Cambridge Consultants became part of Capgemini Invent.

== History ==
Cambridge Consultants was founded in 1960 by Tim Eiloart, Rodney Dale and David Southward, three University of Cambridge graduates who wanted to make the university's scientific expertise available to industry. Its first premises were in Ram Yard, Cambridge. It was one of the first technology-transfer companies in the UK, and many later firms in the Cambridge Cluster grew out of it or its offshoots.

In the late 1960s the company set up a subsidiary, Advanced Instrumentation Modules (AIM), to manufacture the instrumentation modules and electronic audio products it had designed. AIM used up most of the company's money and half of its consultants' time, and Cambridge Consultants went into receivership in 1970. That year its managing director, Gordon Edge, left and persuaded PA Consulting to set up a technology group, from which Scientific Generics and The Technology Partnership later broke away. The American consultancy Arthur D. Little took over the company and its 60 or so staff in 1971 and let it run autonomously. In 1979 the company moved to a new building on the Cambridge Science Park.

Defence work made up as much as two-thirds of its business in the 1970s. It tapered off in the 1980s, when the Ministry of Defence moved to competitive tendering and began asking contractors to subsidise development, terms the company had little reason to accept as it had no factories to keep busy. Scientists and engineers from its defence work moved to commercial projects such as industrial laser systems and underwater ultrasonics for the oil industry.

Arthur D. Little's own financial needs at times limited how much the company could invest in its ventures, and the parent's Chapter 11 bankruptcy filing in February 2002 forced Cambridge Consultants to sell several of its venture holdings early. Two months later about 20 of the 240 staff, led by chief executive Brian Moon, bought the company in a management buyout for £9 million in cash and £16 million of assumed liabilities. The main backer of the buyout was Altran, which became the company's owner.

Capgemini bought Altran in 2020, and in 2021 Cambridge Consultants was brought into Capgemini Invent.

== Operations ==
Cambridge Consultants develops products, creates and licenses intellectual property and provides technology consulting for clients. It works in sectors including medical devices, pharmaceuticals, energy, telecommunications, aerospace, defence, consumer products, and retail and logistics.

In 2025 most of its 740 staff worked at its headquarters on the Cambridge Science Park, and it also had offices in Boston, Singapore and Tokyo. Richard Traherne succeeded Monty Barlow as chief executive in April 2026.

== Projects ==
The company's Prism 100, a portable ultra-wideband radar that showed movement on the far side of a wall, was on sale to law enforcement agencies by 2005. With Ocado the company developed RCOM, a wireless network based on 4G technology, to control the robots in Ocado's automated warehouse at Andover, which was in final testing in early 2016. During the COVID-19 pandemic it developed the Veloci-Vent ventilator design with MetLase for the UK government's Ventilator Challenge. In May 2020 the Cabinet Office stopped supporting it and four other new designs, as they needed further development before clinical testing and were not required to meet immediate demand.

== Spin-outs ==
The company's inkjet work began in the late 1960s with a Post Office contract to develop envelope-franking technology. A textile-printing project for ICI followed, and when ICI withdrew around 1974 Cambridge Consultants bought back the single-nozzle patents. Inkjet development continued in its Printing Systems Group until the mid-2000s, and most of the printing companies spun out of it were led by heads of the group.

Domino Printing Sciences was spun out in 1978 by group leader Graeme Minto to use single-nozzle continuous inkjet technology for the date-marking of products, which new European legislation required. It floated on the London Stock Exchange in 1985 and was bought by Brother Industries for £1 billion in 2015.

Unlike Domino, Xaar, spun out in 1990, developed drop-on-demand inkjet technology. Inca Digital followed in 2000 to serve the wide-format printing market.

Cambridge Silicon Radio (CSR) was spun out in 1999, partly because demand for semiconductor design projects had fallen. Its founders had worked together on short-range radio and chip-design projects at Cambridge Consultants and set out to put a Bluetooth radio on a single chip. Cambridge Consultants supplied a Bluetooth software stack and microprocessor core, and CSR floated on the London Stock Exchange in February 2004. Qualcomm bought CSR for about £1.6 billion in 2015.

Alphamosaic was spun out in 2000 by Robert Swann and Steve Barlow to develop low-power multimedia processors based on its VideoCore architecture. Broadcom bought it for US$123 million in September 2004.
