= James Collier =

James Collier may refer to:

- James Collier (politician) (1872–1933), U.S. Representative from Mississippi
- James Collier (cashier), Chief Cashier of the Bank of England (1739–1751)
- James D. Y. Collier (born 1958), microelectronics engineer
- James Lincoln Collier (born 1928), American author and journalist
- James Stansfield Collier, English physician and neurologist
- James Graham Collier (1937–2011), English jazz bassist
- Jim Collier (born 1939), American football tight end
- Jimmy Collier (born 1945), American folk musician and civil rights activist
- James A. Collier, owner of the Utah Stars

== See also ==
- Rob James-Collier (born 1976), English actor
