= CSR plc =

Former U.K. semiconductor company

- Type: Public
- Industry: Semiconductors; Communications
- Founded: 1998; 28 years ago (as Cambridge Silicon Radio)
- Defunct: 14 August 2015
- Fate: Acquired by Qualcomm
- Headquarters: Cambridge, England, U.K.
- Key people: Ron Mackintosh (chairman); Joep van Beurden (CEO); Will Gardiner (CFO)
- Products: Fabless semiconductor that included connectivity, audio, imaging and GPS chips
- Revenue: US$774.8 million (2014)
- Operating income: US$97.0 million (2014)
- Net income: US$96.8 million (2014)
- Website: csr.com

CSR plc (formerly Cambridge Silicon Radio) was a multinational fabless semiconductor company headquartered in Cambridge, United Kingdom. Its main products were connectivity, audio, imaging and location chips. CSR was listed on the London Stock Exchange and was a constituent of the FTSE 250 Index until it was acquired by Qualcomm in August 2015. The company was since renamed as Qualcomm Technologies International, Ltd.

== History ==
The company was founded in 1998 and split away from Cambridge Consultants as Cambridge Silicon Radio or CSR, in 1999. The founding directors, who were all at Cambridge Consultants at the time, were Phil O'Donovan, James Collier and Glenn Collinson. It was first listed on the London Stock Exchange in 2004.

In 2005 the company acquired Clarity Technologies, a leading clear voice capture (CVC) business and UbiNetics, a 3G wireless (WCDMA/UMTS/HSDPA) technology company. In 2007, CSR acquired Nordnav, a Swedish-based GPS software company, and CPS, a Cambridge-based GPS software company producing Enhanced GPS in partnership with Motorola.

In February 2009, CSR announced it was merging with SiRF, the biggest global supplier of GPS chips, in a share deal worth $136 million; in July 2010, CSR announced the acquisition of Belfast-based APT Licensing Ltd. (APT) and its aptX audio technology and in February 2011, CSR announced it was merging with Zoran, a video and imaging technology company.

In May 2012, CSR acquired Direct Digital Feedback Amplifier (DDFA) technology, a proprietary, highly scalable digital Class-D audio amplifier technology; in June 2012, CSR announced that it had acquired the MAPX (formerly MAP-X) audio product line from Trident Microsystems, Inc and in July 2012, Samsung Electronics agreed to acquire CSR's mobile phone connectivity (Bluetooth and Wi-Fi) and location (GPS/GNSS) businesses and associated IP for US$310 million (£198 million). As part of the deal Samsung acquired a stake of 4.9% in CSR.

In June 2014, CSR acquired the people and technology of Reciva, a networked audio streaming platform, for US$5 million and in October 2014, the acquisition of CSR by Qualcomm for $2.5 billion was agreed. The transaction was completed in August 2015.

== Products ==
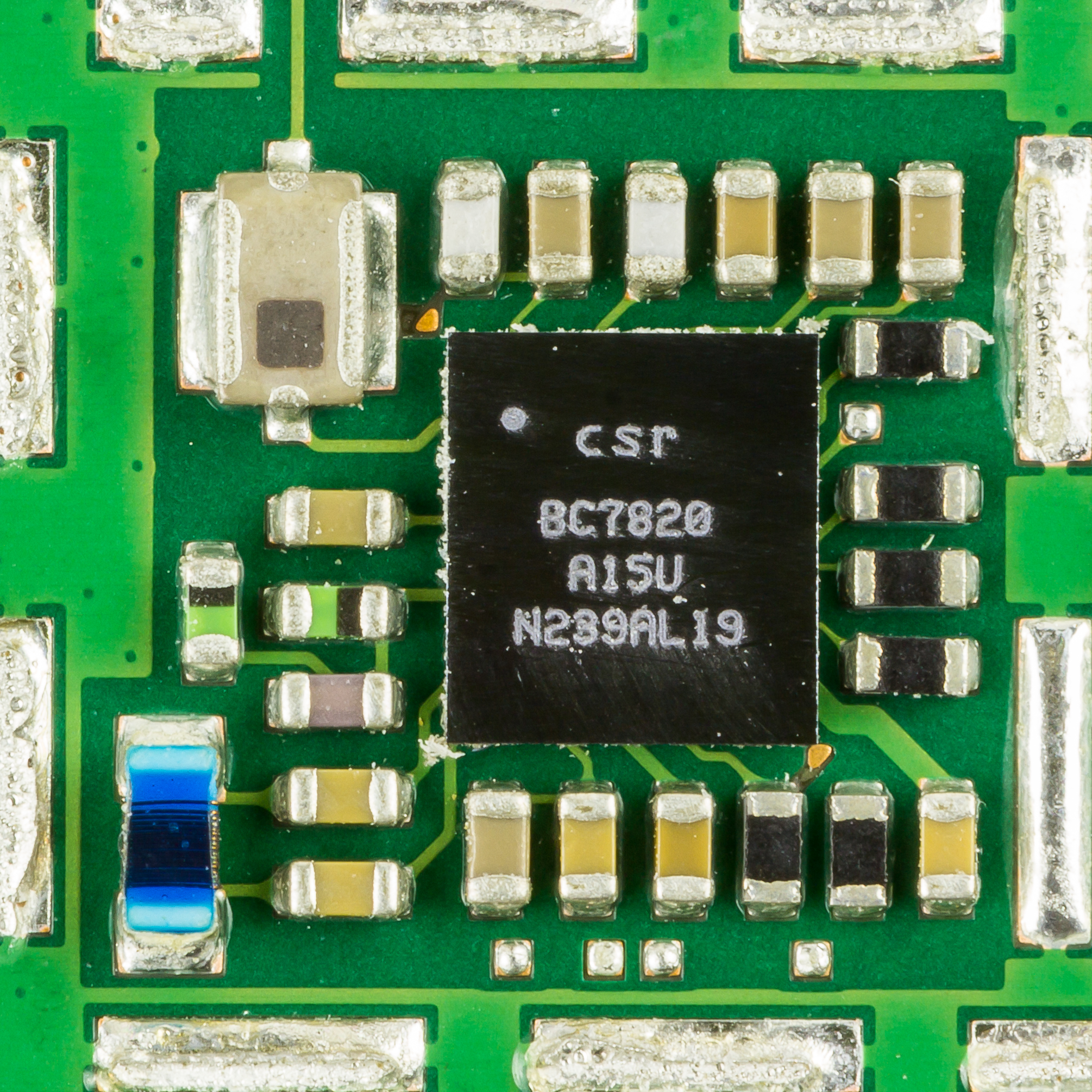
CSR BC7820

CSR's products included platform solutions for Bluetooth, GPS, FM broadcasting, Wi-Fi, audio, imaging, and ARM processors. After the Zoran merger, CSR also made digital imaging products based on the MIPS architecture.

== Offices ==
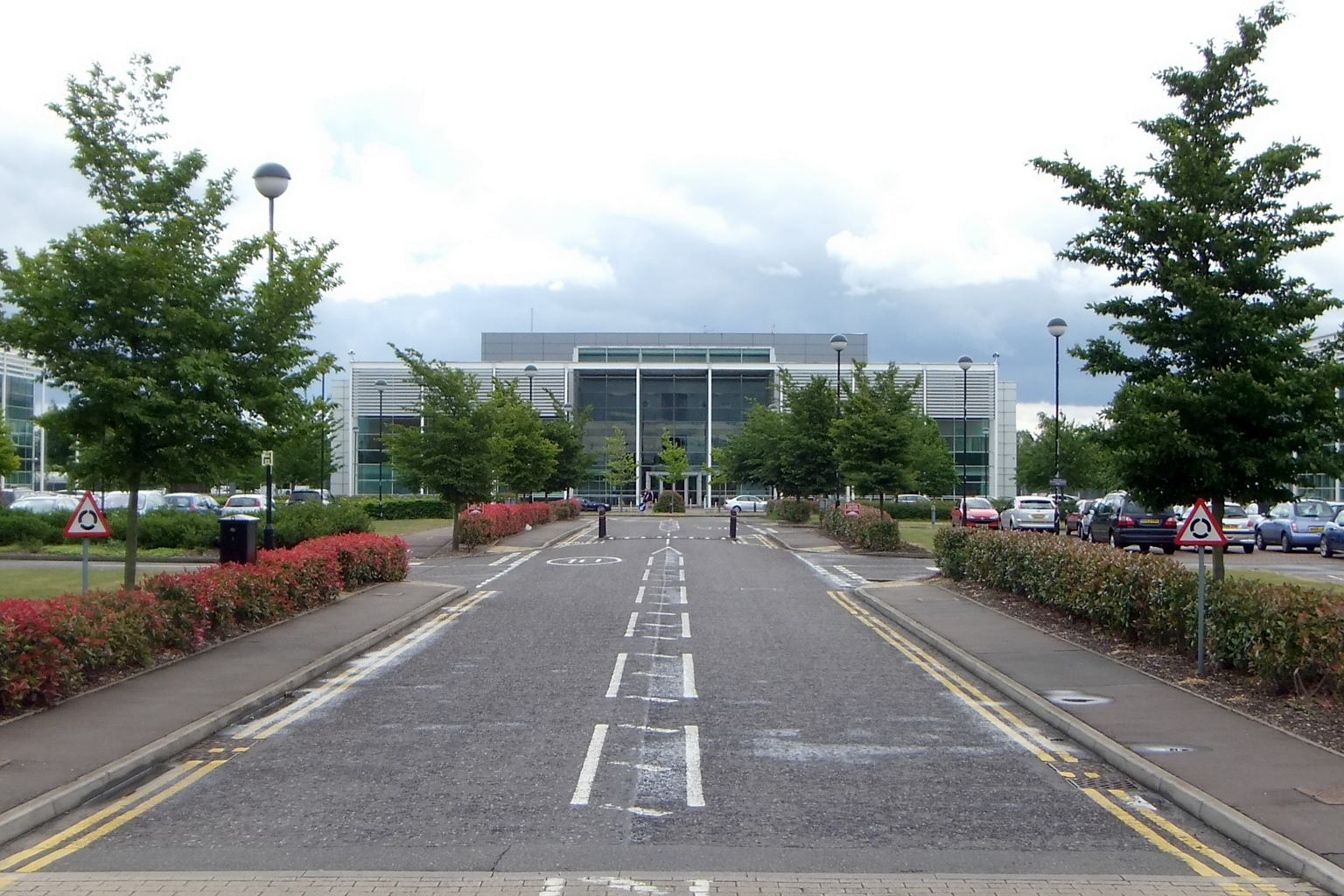
Churchill House, part of CSR's corporate campus at the Cambridge Business Park

CSR had 27 offices in 13 countries:

- Churchill House, Cambridge Business Park, Cambridge, UK
- Trinity House, Cambridge Business Park, Cambridge, UK
- Selwyn House, Cambridge Business Park, Cambridge, UK
- Unit 400, Cambridge Science Park, Cambridge, UK
- Part of St. John's House, St. John's Innovation Park, Cambridge, UK
- Quay West, Manchester, England, UK
- Bristol and Bath Science Park, Bristol, England, UK
- Legacy Building, Catalyst Inc, Belfast, Northern Ireland, UK
- Ingolstadt, Germany
- Freiburg, Germany
- Haifa, Israel
- Auburn Hills, Michigan, United States
- Phoenix, Arizona, United States
- Sunnyvale, California, United States
- Santa Ana, California, United States
- Burlington, Massachusetts, United States
- Plano, Texas, United States
- Beijing, China
- Shanghai, China
- Shenzhen, China
- Prestige Technology Park II, Bangalore, India
- Noida, India
- Tokyo, Japan
- Seongnam, Gyunggi-Do, Korea
- Gumi, Korea
- United Square, Singapore
- Taipei, Taiwan
- Zhongli, Taiwan
- Lund, Ideon Science Park, Sweden
