= Bidwells =

Land company

Bidwells LLP
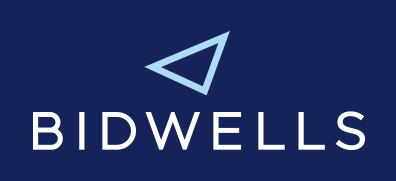
- 2016 Corporate Logo
- Type: Private
- Industry: Real Estate
- Founded: 1839; 187 years ago
- Headquarters: Cambridge
- Key people: Nick Pettit, Senior Partner
- Products: Residential, commercial, rural property & services
- Revenue: ▲£50.25 million (2019)
- Number of employees: 500+ (2019)
- Website: bidwells.co.uk

Bidwells LLP is a multi-disciplined firm of property and agribusiness consultants offering property services and consultancy in the U.K. Bidwells has 13 offices throughout the U.K, 9 of which are located in England and 4 in Scotland. Property Week ranks Bidwells in its Top 20 Property Consultants, making it the largest independent property consultancy outside London.

== History ==
=== 1800–1900 ===
- 1839 Charles Muriel Bidwell commences business in Ely.
- 1866 Charles Bidwell Jnr joins the firm.
- 1874 Charles Bidwell Snr dies.
- 1880 Cambridge office in Mill Lane opens.

=== 1900–1950 ===
- 1905 Charles Bidwell Jnr becomes President of the RICS.
- 1920 Norman Hodgkinson becomes a Partner – The firm moves into commercial work.
- 1921 Charles retires from the business and is succeeded by his two sons, John and Philip.
- 1922 Charles Bidwell dies.
- 1935 Purchase of Trimley Estate for Trinity College.
- 1939 Francis Pemberton joins the firm.
- 1940 Francis Pemberton manages the Trimley Estate.
- 1941 Francis Pemberton moves to Cambridge.

=== 1950–2000 ===
- 1955 The firm moves to Kings Parade.
- 1968 New office opened at Trumpington.
- 1976 Francis Pemberton knighted.
- 1981 Tim Lawson becomes Senior Partner.
- 1985 London Office opens.
- 1987 Jas W. King acquired at Perth.
- 1988 Stone Cross Office opens.
- 1989 John Tweddle becomes Senior Partner. Norwich Office opens.
- 1990 Ipswich Office opens.
- 1992 Inverness Office opens.
- 1994 James Buxton becomes Managing Partner.
- 1995 Anthony Hart becomes Managing Partner in Scotland. Northampton Office opens.
- 1999 The Professional Services Division is formed. London Office moves to Pollen Street. Partnership Structure is changed.

=== 2000–2010 ===
- 2000 James Buxton becomes Senior Partner. West Highlands Estates Office joins Bidwells
- 2003 Acquisition of Drake and Partners Opening of Milton Keynes Office
- 2004 Acquisition of Carpenter Planning Consultancy New offices open in Chelmsford and Saffron Walden
- 2005 Acquisition of TCC Architects & Bret Hallworth & Co Ltd
- 2008 Acquisition of rural surveying practice Faulkners. Building Consultancy win two highly commended David Urwin Awards
- 2009 Bidwells convert to Limited Liability Partnership (LLP).
- 2010 Patrick McMahon takes over as Senior Partner. Finlay Clark takes over as Managing Partner of Scotland.

=== 2011–current ===
- 2011 Milton Keynes Office moves to John Ormond House. Oxford Office opens. Sir Francis Pemberton dies at 95. Sir Francis had a huge influence on the early years of Bidwells including working with Trinity College on the creation of the Cambridge Science Park.
- 2022 Nick Pettit takes over as Senior Partner. Finlay Clark takes over as Deputy Managing Partner.

== Services ==
- Investment & Acquisitions
- Sales, Letting
- Consultancy
- Residential, Commercial & Rural
- Property & Estate Management
- Valuation
- Fund Management
- Building Consultancy
- Planning Services
- Environmental Impact Assessment (EIA) Services
- Agribusiness Consultancy

== See also ==
- Strutt & Parker
- King Sturge
- Savills
- Knight Frank
- Carter Jonas
