= Alphamosaic =

- Company type: Private (acquired by Broadcom)
- Industry: semiconductor
- Fate: Acquired by Broadcom
- Headquarters: Cambridge, United Kingdom
- Key people: Robert Swann (Co-Founder) Steve Barlow (Co-Founder) Jalal Bagherli (CEO)
- Number of employees: 15 (2001)

Alphamosaic Ltd was a fabless semiconductor company specialising in low power mobile multimedia processors, based on their VideoCore architecture.

== History ==
Alphamosaic was founded in Cambridge, UK by Robert Swann and Steve Barlow in October 2000, as a spin out from Cambridge Consultants supported by venture capital from Prelude Trust, ACT and TTP Ventures.

The company developed semiconductor coprocessor chips for the processing of audio, video, imaging, graphics, games and ring tones. The coprocessors were based on VideoCore technology that the company developed, and announced in November 2002.

Later in 2002, Alphamosaic announced the launch of their first multimedia processor, VC01.

In September 2004, Alphamosaic was acquired by Broadcom for $123 million, forming its Mobile Multimedia group on the Cambridge Science Park site.

== See also ==
- VideoCore
