= Magnadata Group =

Magnadata International
- Industry: Printing
- Fate: Acquired by Paragon Group
- Headquarters: Horncastle Road, Boston, Lincolnshire, PE21 9HZ
- Area served: Global
- Key people: Roy Colclough; Chief Executive
- Products: Smart ticketing systems
- Services: Printer servicing
- Revenue: £34 million
- Divisions: Magnadata USA, Magnadata Pty
- Subsidiaries: Norprint

Magnadata Group, also known as Magnadata International, was a printing company based in Boston in Lincolnshire, specialising in the development and manufacture of security and access control media including magnetic smart tickets and tags. It was placed into administration in 2015, and was subsequently sold to Paragon Group.

== History ==
=== Norprint ===
Norcros was founded on 29 May 1956. The name Norcros came from Normanby, North Lincolnshire, home of Normanby Hall. A Director of the company was John Vincent Sheffield, former High Sheriff of Lincolnshire from 1944-5, and great-uncle of the wife of David Cameron. Other members of the Sheffield family—Edmund and George—were directors.

Norprint International was based on Norfolk Street in Boston. It had a division on Valley Road in Dovercourt on the Essex coast with 550 staff. Norprint also made ticket printing machines. Norprint claimed to be Europe's largest producer of industrial and retail labelling systems, and the largest in the world outside of America.

In early 1968 it helped to start the I'm Backing Britain campaign, by running off the promotional stickers for free. Before the days of barcodes in supermarkets, Norprint made hand-held price labellers, used by the main supermarkets; these were made in Harwich.

In April 1989 it received a Queen's Award for Technological Achievement for its magnetic striped and encoded tickets and payment tokens.

Norprint produced tickets for airlines and the London Underground. It was owned by Norcros plc.

On 25 June 1998 Norcros put Norprint up for sale. In July 1998 Norprint was bought by a management buyout (MBO) for £7.9 million. After the buyout it was known as Norprint Labelling Systems.

In 2005 it developed the Nortag, a small inconspicuous RFID label on products to combat shoplifting, which won The Queen's Award for Enterprise: Innovation (Technology) in April 2005. It is known as electronic article surveillance (EAS). The Nortag took seven years to develop.

=== Magnadata ===
In February 2006 Magnadata, also based in Boston, bought Norprint from administration. At the time Norprint had 226 staff and Magnadata had 193. Magnadata's customers included the London Underground, New York Metro, Sydney Rail Authority, Royal Mail, TNT, Manchester City Football Club, and the Ryder Cup organisation.

=== UK train tickets ===
In August 2010 it was awarded a £24 million contract to produce 750 million magnetic strip train tickets a year in the UK for the Association of Train Operating Companies (ATOC).

=== Administration ===
In 2015 Magnadata was placed into administration and was acquired by Paragon Group, becoming part of its BemroseBooth Paragon subsidiary. Norprint, which was a subsidiary of Magnadata, was not acquired by Paragon Group and was closed.

== Location ==
The company was based in the north of Boston on the B1183. In 2021, planning permission was given to build forty-seven houses on its former site by local housing association Longhurst Group.
