= James D. Y. Collier =

British physicist and engineer (born 1958)

James Collier FRS FREng
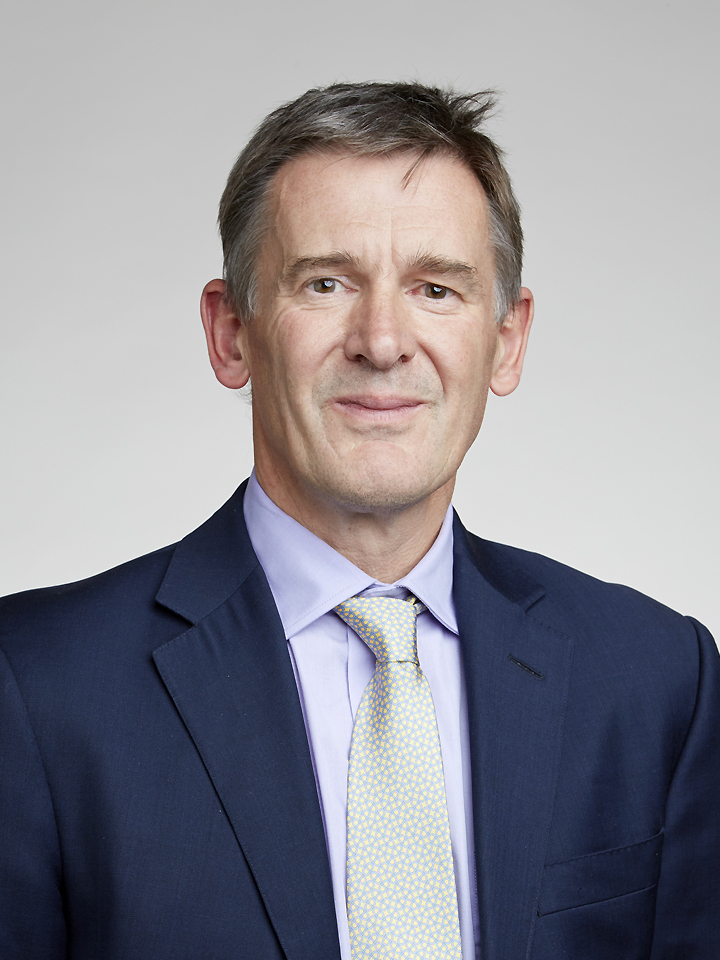
- Collier in 2016
- Born: December 1958 (age 67)
- Education: University of Oxford
- Awards: MacRobert Award
- Scientific career
- Workplaces: CSR plc; Cambridge Consultants; Schlumberger; UbiNetics

James Digby Yarlet Collier (born December 1958) is a British physicist and engineer. He was the chief technology officer of Neul Limited. Previously, he held several technical and executive positions at Cambridge Silicon Radio (CSR), UbiNetics, Cambridge Consultants and Schlumberger

== Education ==
Collier was born in December 1958. He was educated at the University of Oxford, where he gained a Bachelor of Arts degree in physics.

== Career ==
Collier co-founded CSR as a corporate spin-off from Cambridge Consultants Limited with a group of eight other people including Glenn Collinson, Phil O'Donovan, Jonathan Kimmitt, Carl Orsborn, Ian Sabberton, Justin Penfold, Robert Young and Graham Pink. He served as CTO of CSR which was acquired by Qualcomm in 2015. Using short-range wireless technology, CSR became a major supplier of integrated circuit designs for Bluetooth, GPS and Wi-Fi. As a fabless manufacturing company, CSR created the first production ready, single chip, CMOS implementation of the Bluetooth standard by putting a radio transmitter, microprocessor and baseband on a single integrated circuit. The techniques developed are now commonplace and included in many consumer Wireless devices.

Between 1984 and 1999, Collier held executive and technical positions at Cambridge Consultants. Prior to 1984, Collier held a number of executive and technical positions at Schlumberger. Collier also served as director UbiNetics IP Ltd from 2005.

In 2010, Collier set up Neul Limited with Glenn Collinson with £8 million in initial investment to exploit machine to machine communication in the weightless wireless communications market. Neul was based in Cambridge Science Park and developed wireless network technology to enable the use of the white space spectrum. Neul had a change of management in 2013 after Collier was ousted by the investors. Neul was not successful in commercialising weightless technology and was later acquired by Huawei in 2014 for $25 million USD.

== Awards and honours ==
In 2005, Collier won the MacRobert Award with his CSR colleagues John Hodgson, Phil O'Donovan, Glenn Collinson and Chris Ladas for their work on Bluecore. He was elected a Fellow of the Royal Society (FRS) in 2016 and is also a Fellow of the Institution of Engineering and Technology (FIET) and a Fellow of the Royal Academy of Engineering (FREng).
