= Phil O'Donovan =

Engineer and angel investor

Phil O’Donovan FREng, FIET, CEng
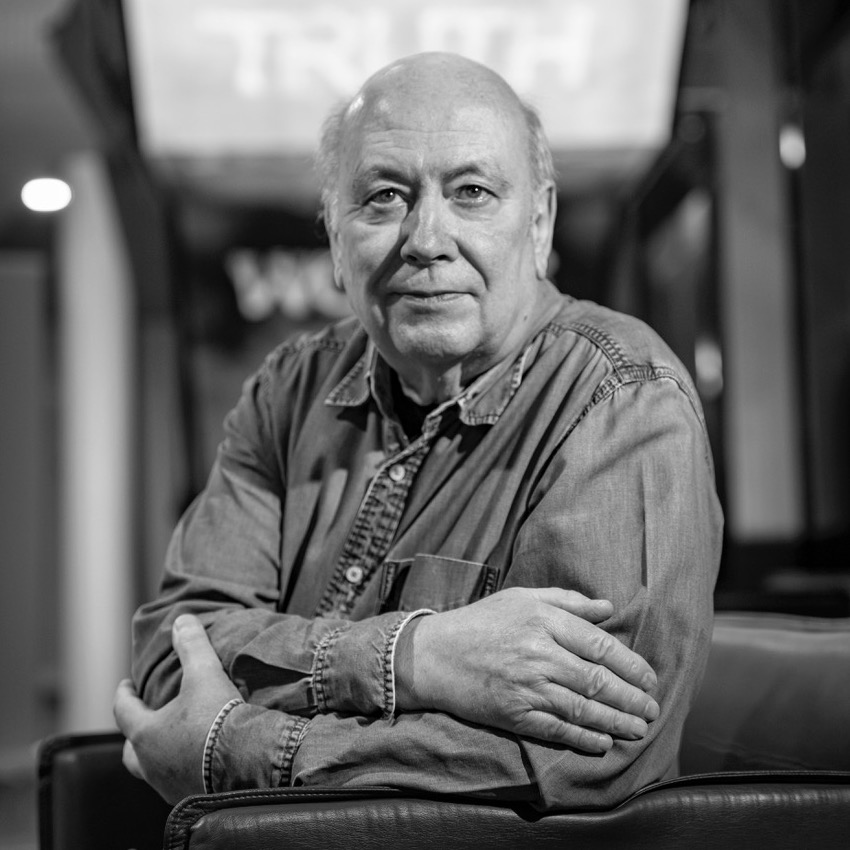
- Born: April 1950 (age 76); Whitechapel, London
- Education: University of Warwick (BSc); University of Birmingham (MSc); University of Essex (PhD)
- Employer(s): AERE Harwell; Standard Telecommunication Laboratories Ltd; High Integrity Systems Ltd; Cambridge Consultants Ltd; CSR plc
- Known for: Engineer, Entrepreneur & Speaker, Angel investor
- Awards: CEng (1982); FIET (2003); RAEng MacRobert Award (2005); FREng (2017); Honorary Dr of the University, University of Essex (2019); Honorary Professor, Essex Business School (2023); Honorary DSc, Warwick Business School (2024)

Phil O'Donovan is a British engineer and entrepreneur. He was a co-founder of Cambridge Silicon Radio Ltd which, as London Stock Exchange FTSE 250 company CSR plc, became the Bluetooth chip market leader.

== Education ==
O'Donovan obtained a BSc in Electrical Engineering Science at the University of Warwick, an MSc in Information and Communications Systems at Birmingham University, and a PhD at Essex University.

== Career ==
O'Donovan joined the Microprocessor Applications Centre at AERE Harwell in 1975 as a Research Fellow where he developed and commissioned a range of rack-mounted Motorola 6800 microprocessor-based modules for automating the use of scanning electron microscopes. In 1978, in support of ITT’s need to exploit microprocessor technology, he joined David Wright’s Microprocessor Technology Centre at ITT’s European research laboratory, Standard Telecommunication Laboratories (STL) in Harlow, where he supported ITT product companies worldwide in their selection and design of microprocessors in to phones, PABXes and Public exchanges.

At STL, O’Donovan bid and was Project Manager of the UK Alvey Programme’s Adaptive Intelligent Dialogues (AID) user interface project led by Standard Telephones and Cables (which had acquired computer company ICL in 1984). The AID project researched the auto-adaption of user interfaces to meet individual user needs and brought together techniques from computer science, artificial intelligence and cognitive psychology in a collaborative pre-competitive project involving six UK companies and universities.

At STL, O’Donovan also became Project Manager of the Functional Analysis of Office Requirements (FAOR) project, funded by the European ESPRIT programme. The FAOR project involved two companies and three universities spanning the UK, Denmark and Germany and developed a methodology for determination of the requirements necessary for an office system to meet pre-defined organisational needs.

O’Donovan left STL in 1986 as Chief Research Engineer and joined former STL colleagues at Harlow-based High Integrity Systems, founded to exploit application of the ADA programming language and support of the Intel iAPX 432 high-performance transparent multiprocessing microprocessor. He grew HIS’ revenue by winning contract design and development projects with defence (MOD), communications (INMARSAT) and telecoms players (Nortel) in the UK.

In 1991, O'Donovan joined Cambridge Consultants Ltd (CCL), the product design and development business of Arthur D. Little, where he became VP Telecoms and bid and won the Ericsson ERMES / FLEX pager chip development, the design of which in standard CMOS, was led by James Collier and which inspired the subsequent creation of Cambridge Silicon Radio Ltd. In October 1998, O’Donovan and eight co-founders spun Cambridge Silicon Radio out of CCL. CSR was first to market in 2001 with its single chip Bluetooth device, BlueCore01™, which operated at 2.4 GHz, was fabricated in commodity CMOS technology and which provided CSR with an inherent cost advantage.

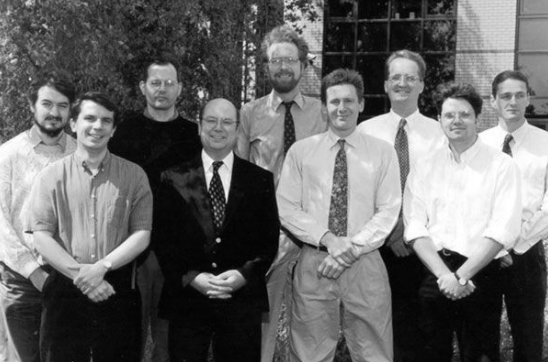
CSR Founders: Front Row Left to Right = Robert Young, Phil O’Donovan, James Collier, Justin Penfold Back Row Left to Right = Jonathan Kimmitt, Carl Orsborn, Graham Pink, Glenn Collinson, Ian Sabberton.

As founding managing director, O'Donovan led Cambridge Silicon Radio to establish an early lead in the Bluetooth chip market as a fabless semiconductor company supplying hundreds of global high-volume manufacturers. CSR's early growth was rapid; it had won 500 qualified Bluetooth designs by June 2004, and by April 2008, had shipped more than a billion chips. CSR joined the London Stock Exchange in April 2004 as CSR plc, and became a FTSE 250 company in June of the same year. More than 98% of CSR’s chips were drop-shipped annually to customers outside the UK from CSR’s foundries including STMicroelectronics in France and TSMC in Taiwan leading to CSR receiving a Queen’s Award for Enterprise (International Trade) in April 2004. In 2005, CSR together with the team comprising John Hodgson, Phil O’Donovan, James Collier, Glenn Collinson and Chris Ladas won the RAEng MacRobert Award for developing and bringing to market CSR's Bluetooth chip BlueCore01™.

CSR's annual revenue reached $1billion in 2012 and, by 2015, employed more than 2,000 people in 23 locations around the world. By 2015, CSR had become the largest global supplier of Bluetooth chips having shipped 4 billion devices. CSR made eight acquisitions and one divestiture prior to 2015 and, following interest from a number of companies, CSR was acquired by US company Qualcomm Inc in September 2015 for $2.5billion.

== Recent career ==
Following CSR’s flotation, O'Donovan became a member of, and invests alongside, the Cambridge Angels, a group of 60 investors in the "greater Cambridge region" most of whom are successful hands-on exited-entrepreneurs.

O’Donovan invests in and directs emerging hard technology companies. Examples include; Oval Medical Technologies (mechanical auto-injectors) sold to SMC Ltd of the US, Neul (radio communications technology) sold to Huawei and ROADMap Systems (optical wavelength-selective switches) sold to Huber+Suhner. He is currently the chair of Forefront RF (front-end modules for phone, wearable and IoT products) founded in late 2020.

O’Donovan speaks on entrepreneurial topics at universities and business schools and in Cambridge, for example, he is or has been an Entrepreneur in Residence at Cambridge University's Centre for Entrepreneurial Learning, a Fellow and speaker at the Judge Business School and a mentor and speaker on the Maxwell Centre's Impulse Programme where his contributions are based upon his experience and are pragmatic in nature.
