= Napp Research Centre =

Medical research institute in Cambridge, UK

- Napp Laboratories
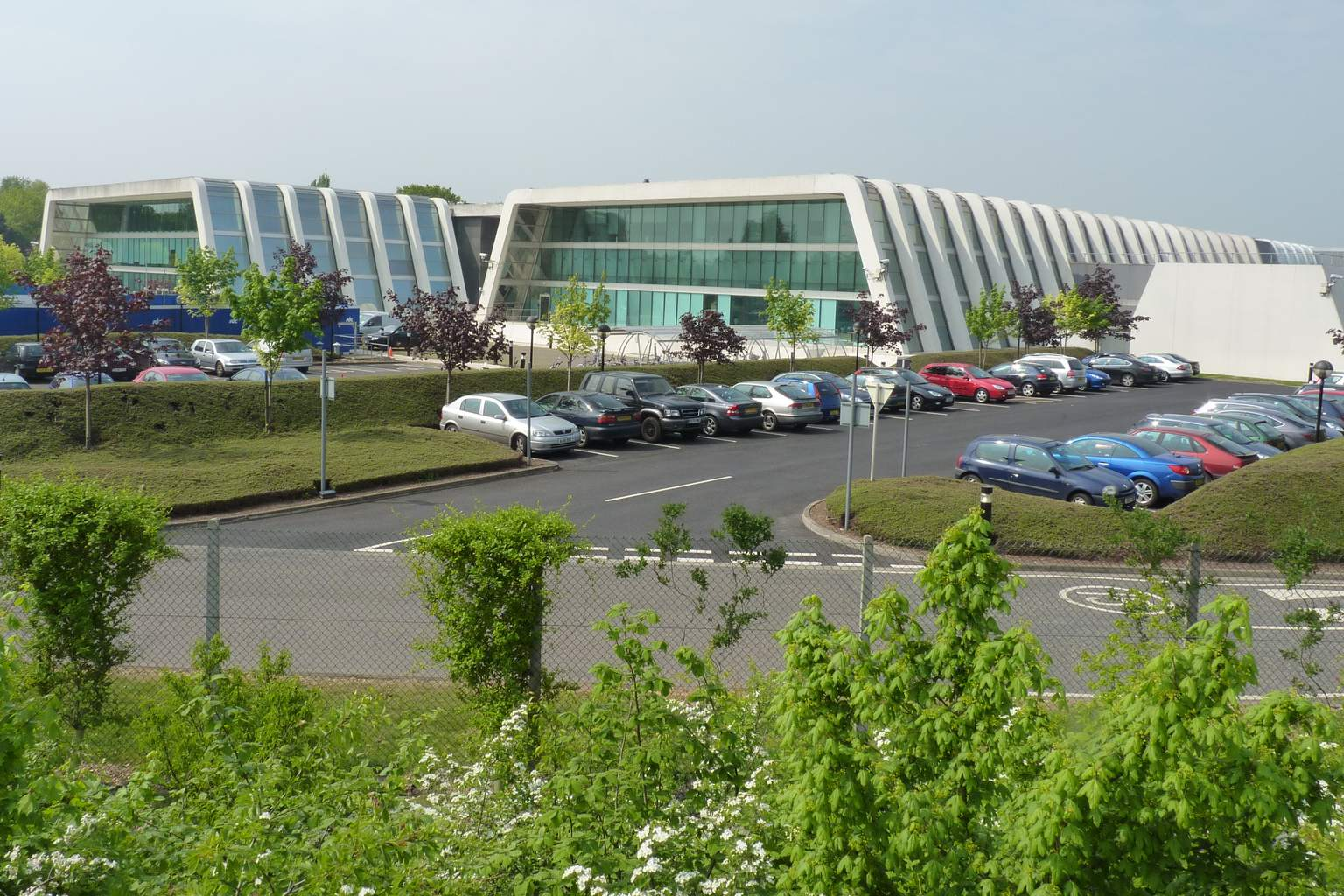
- View from the A14 in April 2011

- Location within Cambridgeshire

General information
- Type: Medical, microbiological and entomological research centre and manufacturing plant
- Architectural style: Minimalist
- Location: Unit 191, Cambridge Science Park, Milton, CB4 0GW
- Coordinates: 52.236°N 0.1485°E
- Elevation: 10 m (33 ft)
- Current tenants: 870 employees
- Completed: April 1984
- Inaugurated: 1984
- Cost: £20m
- Client: Napp
- Owner: Napp

Dimensions
- Other dimensions: 28 acres

Technical details
- Structural system: Concrete curtain wall and glass block
- Floor count: 3
- Floor area: 110,000 sq ft

Design and construction
- Architecture firm: Yakeley Associates
- Structural engineer: Halsall Associates
- Main contractor: John Laing

The Napp Research Centre was a large medical research institute in the north of Cambridge, and innovative-looking and award-winning architecture; it is a Cambridge landmark.

== History ==
Cambridge Science Park was established in the early 1970s. The Napp Research Centre was constructed on the park by the Napp Pharmaceutical Group, a pharmaceutical firm that manufactures analgesic, oncology and respiratory products.

The site would be 28 acres, with 20 acres of land from Trinity College, Cambridge, and 8 acres of land from St John's College, Cambridge. The whole site had been promoted by Sir John Bradfield, the senior bursar of Trinity College.

The plant would be 110,000 sq ft. Napp had plants at Leavesden, Hertfordshire, and West Drayton (Cooper and Prior Laboratories), with research in Aberdeen. The company was known for the germicide Betadine (povidone-iodine), often found in British hospital theatres. The site needed an Industrial Development Certificate from the government.

Napp donated £5,000 to the Milton All Saints parish church extension fund in October 1984, who needed £35,000. The building is in the parish of Milton, Cambridgeshire, on the northern edge of Cambridge.

=== Construction ===
The building was designed in 1979 by the Canadian architect Arthur Erickson, and was mostly completed in 1981. Staff moved in in September 1983. It was to open in June 1983. The architect was Yakeley Associates. It was to cost £8m, but cost £20m. The building was fully complete in April 1984. It had the buttress style of architecture.

Turf was dug on Monday 20 October 1980, with Sir Alan Hodgkin, Master of Trinity College. Building started in January 1981. It was built by Laing Management Contracting, based in Luton, to be finished by February 1983. At the time, Laing were also building the Grafton Centre. It had 102 concrete ribs of 10 metres height, each of 18 tonnes. There were three main buildings.

Barry Cahill was the project manager for the construction. The columns were made from Spanish dolomite aggregate, cast at the Atlas Works (Anglian Building Products) near Lenwade in Norfolk, now called Cemex Building Products. These columns were reinforced by pre-stressing, and installed with laser techniques. The exterior had mirror-reflective double glazing, installed by a technique called structural glazing. The largest pane of glass weighed around 250kg. The roofing membrane was Sarnafil, made by Sika AG, which absorbed UV light. The reflective pool, on the south side, was also the reservoir for the fire-fighting sprinkler system.

The flooring was made by Intek of Hereford. The cooling towers were made by Heenan Marley of Worcester (now called SPX Cooling Technologies UK). Manufacturing equipment came from Bausch + Ströbel of eastern Baden-Württemberg in Germany. Glass was supplied by Wright & Offland of Wythenshawe, now Float Glass Industries.

Manufacturing took place at the south and eastern ends of the building, on the first floor, with the filling line on the first floor. All of the building was air-conditioned, with manufacturing clean rooms, made by ASSAB of Tewkesbury.

Catering would be provided by Grandmet Compass Services of Dunstable.

Three more buildings were added in 2007. Stage D, E and F1 were added in 2012, designed by CPN Architects.

=== Visits ===
- Prince Philip, Duke of Edinburgh visited the building on 6 February 1985. The Duke had visited Clare College and Strangeways Research Laboratory. He visited Cambridge Science Park, with Sir John Butterfield, later returning to the New Museums Site at Cambridge, to give a lecture at the Babbage Lecture Theatre
- Princess Margaret visited the building on 19 October 1985.
- The deputy director of the Education Commission of China, Yang Hai bo visited in December 1986
- Chief economic advisor to Mikhail Gorbachev, Abel Aganbegyan, visited on Monday 23 November 1987. It was his first visit to the UK, with research director Stewart Leslie, and was looking to set up a science park in Russia
- On 14 July 1988, the site was visited by the seventh President of Turkey, Kenan Evren.
- On Friday 27 May 1988 it was visited by the Prime Minister Margaret Thatcher, after visiting Cambridge Life Sciences; she was at the science park for two and a quarter hours, with Sir John Butterfield, linked to the formation, that year, of the British Lung Foundation. She was with the Conservative Cambridge MP Robert Rhodes James, and later visited Papworth Hospital, meeting surgeon Terence English, with Conservative South-West Cambridgeshire MP Sir Anthony Grant and Air Vice-Marshal Reggie Bullen. Earlier in the day, there had been around twenty students at the science park's Trinity Centre protesting about proposed top-up loans.
- The King of Jordan, Abdullah II of Jordan, visited the site with Prince Andrew, Duke of York on 7 November 2001; the visit also included Zeus Technology
- Deputy Prime Minister Nick Clegg visited on 3 April 2014

=== Collaborations ===
The site works with Cambridge Academy for Science and Technology, a UTC.

== Structure ==
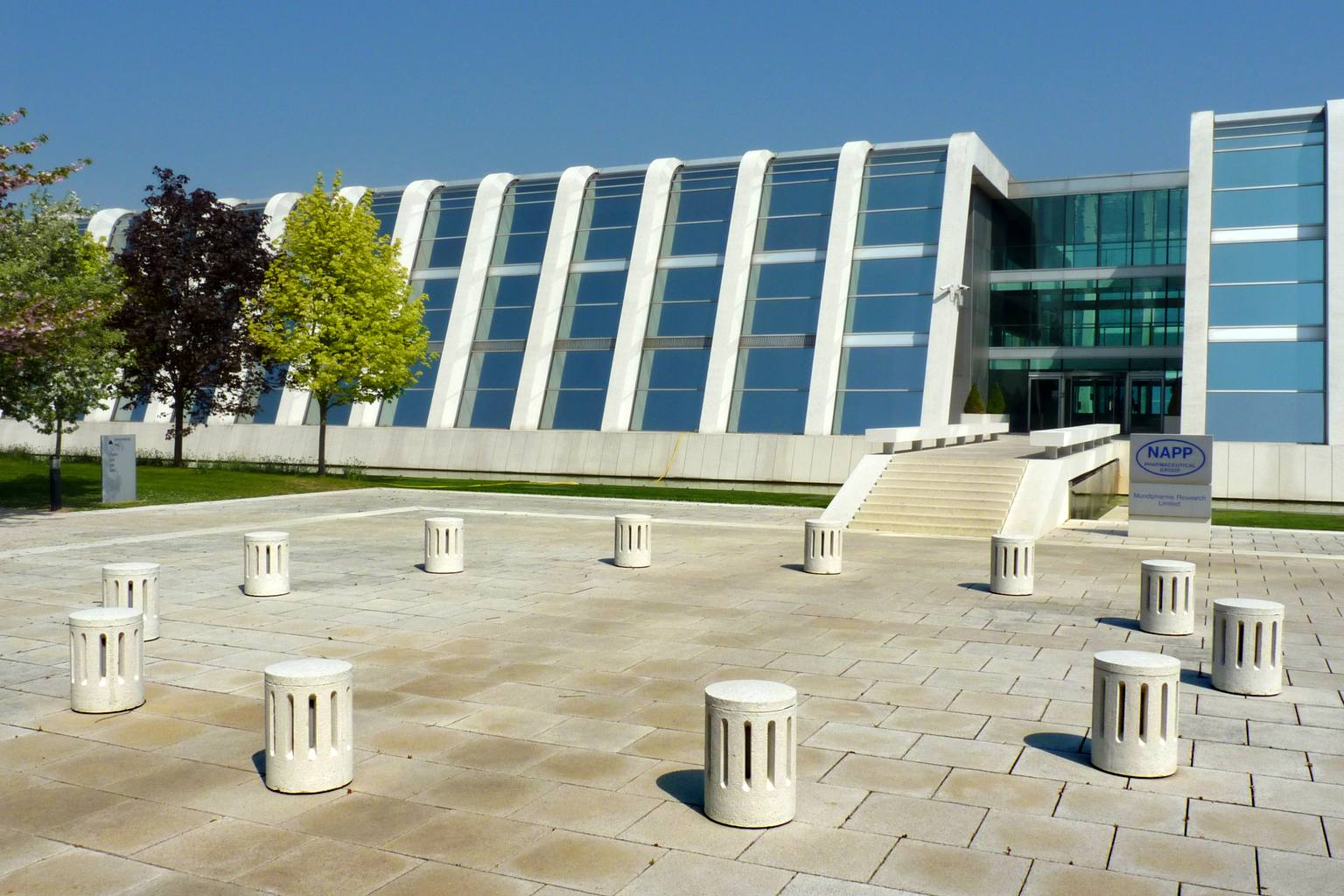
Entrance in April 2011

The site is directly next to the A10/A14 interchange, in South Cambridgeshire.

The manufacturing area had a visitors' gallery. There was an auditorium. Warehouse staff moved in first, in June 1983, with the others moving in September 1983. Many staff moved from Aberdeen; 25% of staff were Scottish.

The building mirrored glass caused solar glare to passing traffic in the late summer, in early September 1984. The glare had been calculated by John Laing Research & Development Ltd of Borehamwood.

== Awards ==
In June 1984 it won The Concrete Society's Award.

In 1985 it was one of six British concrete buildings to be entered for a competition of the European Cement Association (CEMBUREAU); another nominated building was the Kodak Distribution Centre at Hemel Hempstead in west Hertfordshire.

== See also ==
- Laboratory of Molecular Biology
