= Samsung Galaxy Grand Max =

Android smartphone developed by Samsung

- Brand: Samsung
- Manufacturer: Samsung
- Type: Smartphone
- Series: Galaxy
- First released: August 14, 2015
- Predecessor: Samsung Galaxy Grand 2
- Compatible networks: 2G GSM, 3G UMTS, 4G LTE
- Dimensions: 146×74.8×7.9 mm (5.75×2.94×0.31 in)
- Weight: 161 g (6 oz)
- Operating system: Original: Android Android 4.4.4 "KitKat"; Current: Android 5.1.1 "Lollipop"
- CPU: Quad-core 1.2 GHz Cortex-A53
- Memory: 1.5 GB RAM
- Storage: 16 GB
- Removable storage: up to 64 GB
- Battery: Li-Ion 2600 mAh
- Rear camera: 13 MP
- Front camera: 5 MP
- Display: 5.25 inch HD Super AMOLED 278 ppi (1280×720).
- Connectivity: WLAN, Bluetooth, USB
- Model: SM-G720N0; SM-G720AX

The Samsung Galaxy Grand Max is an Android smartphone manufactured by Samsung Electronics and was released in 2015.

== Features ==
- Rear Camera: 13 MP
- Front Camera: 5 MP
- Memory: 1.5 GB RAM
- Storage: 16 GB
- Battery: Li-Ion 2500 mAh
- Size: 5.25 In
- Operating System: Android 4.4.4 KitKat (original); Android 5.1.1 Lollipop (current; upgradable)
- Weight: 161 g
- IPS LCD capacitive touchscreen
- CPU: Quad-core 1.2 GHz Cortex-A53
- Chipset: Qualcomm MSM8916 Snapdragon 410
- GPU: Adreno 306
- WLAN: Wi-Fi 802.11 a/b/g/n, dual-band, Wi-Fi Direct, hotspot
- Bluetooth: v4.0, A2DP, EDR, LE
- USB: microUSB v2.0
- Sensors: Accelerometer, proximity, gyroscope.
- Other: South Korea Model supports T-DMB & Smart DMB
