= Extended-release morphine =

Medication

Structural formula of morphine

Extended-release (or slow-release) formulations of morphine are those whose effect lasts substantially longer than bare morphine, availing for, e.g., one administration per day. Conversion between extended-release and immediate-release (or "regular") morphine is easier than conversion to or from an equianalgesic dose of another opioid with different half-life, with less risk of altered pharmacodynamics.

== Brand names ==
Brand names for this formulation of morphine include Avinza, Kadian, MS Contin, MST Continus, Morphagesic, Zomorph, Filnarine, MXL, Malfin, Contalgin, Dolcontin, and DepoDur. MS Contin is a trademark of Purdue Pharma, and is available in the United States and Australia. In the UK, MS Contin is marketed by NAPP Pharmaceuticals as MST Continus. MS Contin is a DEA Schedule II substance in the United States, a Schedule 8 (controlled) drug in Australia and a Schedule 2 CD (Controlled Drug) in the UK.

Avinza is made by King Pharmaceuticals and Kadian is made by Actavis Pharmaceuticals. Unlike the MS Contin brand and its generic versions, Kadian and Avinza are designed to be 12- to 24-hour release, not 8- to 12-hour. So instead of 2–3 times a day dosing, it can be 1–2 times.

MST Continus and MXL are registered copyright and trademark of Napp Pharmaceuticals and are available in the UK. MXL is a 24-hour release formula designed to be taken once daily. It is available in doses between 30 mg and 200 mg in 30 mg intervals (equating to between 1.25 mg/hour and 8.33 mg/hour). MST Continus is a 12-hour release formula, therefore it is given 2 times per day. It is available in the following doses: 5 mg, 10 mg, 15 mg, 30 mg, 60 mg, 100 mg and 200 mg tablets (equating to between 0.416 mg/hour and 16.67 mg/hour).

== Dosage comparison ==
For constant pain, the relieving effect of extended-release morphine given once (for Kadian) or twice (for MS Contin) every 24 hours is roughly the same as multiple administrations of immediate release (or "regular") morphine. Morphine sulfate pentahydrate (trade names including Dolcontin) has a higher molecular mass than morphine base, and therefore 10 mg morphine sulfate pentahydrate contains approximatively 7.5 mg of morphine free base. Extended-release morphine can be administered together with "rescue doses" of immediate-release morphine pro re nata in case of breakthrough pain, each generally consisting of 5% to 15% of the 24-hour extended-release dosage.

== Structure ==
Some brands may have a pellet (spheroid) formulations (made by extrusion and spheronization) can be used for controlled release of the drug in the body whereas powder filled pellets generally cannot. The plastic spheres containing powder have micropores that open at varying pH levels, to maintain a mostly constant release during transit through the digestive tract. The spheres themselves, the outer shells, pass undigested in most patients. Other brands are thought to use ethylcellulose coatings to control drug release from pellets. Another use these medications have is that they can be given via NG tube, the pellets being very small. This makes them one of the few extended release oral medications that can be given by feeding tube.

== Opioid replacement therapy ==
According to a Cochrane review in 2013, extended-release morphine as an opioid replacement therapy for people with heroin addiction or dependence confers a possible reduction of opioid use and with fewer depressive symptoms but overall more adverse effects when compared to other forms of long-acting opioids. The length of time in treatment was not found to be significantly different.
