= Samsung Galaxy Grand =

Smartphone developed by Samsung Electronics

Samsung Galaxy Grand Duos - i9082
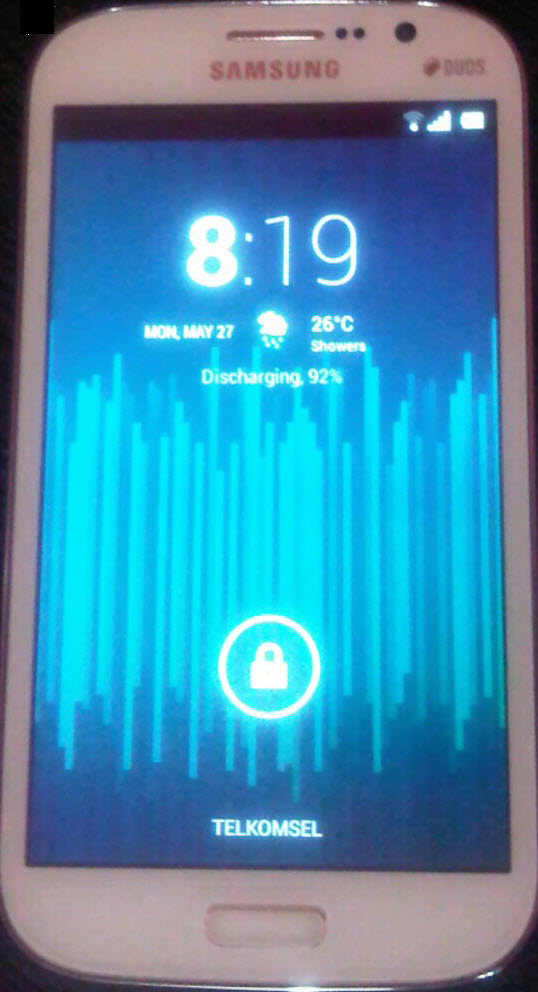
- 'Marble White' Galaxy Grand Duos (GT-i9082), running Cyanogenmod 10.1.
- Manufacturer: Samsung Electronics
- Type: Touchscreen smartphone
- Series: Samsung Galaxy
- First released: 21 January 2013 (GT-I9082); 2013 (GT-I9080)
- Successor: Samsung Galaxy Grand 2
- Related: Samsung Galaxy Grand Neo
- Compatible networks: EDGE / GPRS (850 / 900 / 1,800 / 1,900 MHz) HSPA+ 21 / 5.76 Mbp/s (Global) LTE (South Korea) CDMA2000 EV-DO Rev.A (800 MHz (China Telecom), Band 4 1.8 GHz (LG U+), TD-SCDMA 1900, 2000 MHz (China Mobile)
- Form factor: Slate
- Weight: 162 g (5.7 oz)
- Operating system: Original: Android 4.1.2 "Jelly Bean"; Current: Android 4.2.2; Updatable with custom rom: LineageOS 14.1 (Android 7.1.2 "Nougat")
- System-on-chip: Broadcom BCM 28155 (Global); Qualcomm Snapdragon 400 MSM8X (2 & 6) 25 (China TD-SCDMA & CDMA); Samsung Exynos 4412 (Korea)
- CPU: 1.2 GHz Cortex-A9 dual-core and 1.2 GHz quad-core (Korea) and Qualcomm kriat 1.2 GHz (China)
- GPU: Broadcom VideoCore IV VPU (global); ARM Mali-400 MP4 440 MHz GPU (Korea); Adreno 305 GPU (China)
- Memory: 1 GB RAM
- Storage: 8 GB
- Removable storage: micro-SD up to 64 GB
- Battery: LiPo 2100 mAh
- Rear camera: 8 MP 1080p Full HD video recording @ 30fps with auto-focus; self-timer; panorama; smile shot; face detection; stop motion
- Front camera: 2 MP
- Display: 5.0 in (13 cm) TFT LCD; 800×480 px WVGA (~187 ppi)
- Connectivity: Bluetooth 4.0 micro-USB 2.0; Wi-Fi (802.11a/b/g/n); Wi-Fi Direct; FM radio with RDS (Global); DMB Mobile TV (Korean); A-GPS and GLONASS
- Data inputs: Multi-touch capacitive touchscreen display Ambient light sensors Microphone; 3-axis Magnetometer (Compass) aGPS; 3-axis accelerometer Stereo FM Radio With RDS and Swype
- Model: GT-I9080 (Single SIM); GT-I9082 (Dual SIM); SHV-E270S/K (LTE, Korean SK Telecom & KT), SHV-E270L (LTE + CDMA2000 1800 MHz (1.8 GHz Korean Pcs))

The Samsung Galaxy Grand is a smartphone developed by Samsung Electronics, first announced on December 18, 2012. The phone has a dual core Cortex-A9 1.2 GHz processor and a RAM of 1 GB, with an internal memory of 8 GB which can be extended to another 64 GB by use of microSD cards. The device also supports internet connectivity through 2G and 3G, apart from Wi-Fi. Navigation systems including A-GPS and GLONASS with Google Maps. The phone runs on the Android 4.1.2 Jelly Bean OS, with Samsung releasing updates up to 4.2.2. However, custom ROMs are available up to Android 7.1.2 Nougat.

The Galaxy Grand features an 8 MP rear camera that is capable of high-resolution photos and video capture. Both cameras are capable of Full HD video recording at 1920×1080p at 30 frames per second. The camera comes with an LED flash that is capable of illuminating your subjects quite adequately even in low light conditions. The secondary front-facing camera is composed of an upgraded 2 MP camera. Autofocus, Geo-tagging, Touch Focus and Face Detection are some of the advanced features supported by the phone, as well as an image stabilizer and smile detector, and basic image editor.

The Samsung Galaxy Grand is powered by a 2100 mAh LiPo that is capable of lasting up to 10 hours. The 5.0 in (13 cm) TFT WVGA, multi-touch screen is capable of 16 million colors.

== Features ==
- 5-inch display, 800×480 px WVGA, 187 ppi pixel density
- Dual SIM (GT-I9082)
- 1 GB RAM (860 MB usable)
- 8 GB internal memory (4 GB user available)
- 8-megapixels primary camera, 2-megapixels secondary camera
- 1080p @30fps full HD video recording. Geo-tagging, touch focus, face and smile detection, image stabilization
- Android 4.1.2 (Jelly Bean);
- Bluetooth, Wi-Fi, 3G, Wi-Fi Direct, Hotspot
- TouchWiz UI, Samsung Apps, Play Store
- Accelerometer, gyro, proximity, compass, GPS and GLONASS support
- Messaging: SMS (threaded view), MMS, Email
- Stereo FM radio with RDS (Global)
- DMB Mobile TV(Korea)
- Google Play, Google Search, Maps, Gmail, YouTube, Calendar, Google Talk, Picasa
- Voice Memo/Dial/Commands

In August 2013, Samsung announced that the Galaxy Grand would receive the Android 4.2.2 OS update. This update was first launched in Russia, while owners in India received the update in early September. This update also brought an updated version of TouchWiz. On February 20, 2014, Samsung Poland announced that Galaxy Grand is among 14 Samsung devices that will receive the Android 4.4 KitKat upgrade.

== Variant ==
Model	Country	Carrier	Network	SoC	CPU	GPU	VPU	other
GT-I9080	international		WCDMA + GSM	Broadcom BCM 28155	ARM Cortex-A9 MP2 1.2 GHz	-	VideoCore-IV 250 MHz	FM-Radio, Single SIM
SHV-E270S	South Korea	SK Telecom	LTE + WCDMA + GSM	Samsung Exynos 4412	ARM Cortex-A9 MP4 1.4 GHz	ARM Mali-400 MP4 440 MHz	-	T-DMB
SHV-E270K	South Korea	KT	LTE + WCDMA + GSM	Samsung Exynos 4412	ARM Cortex-A9 MP4 1.4 GHz	ARM Mali-400 MP4 440 MHz	-	T-DMB
SHV-E270L	South Korea	LG U+	LTE + WCDMA + GSM + CDMA2000 EV-DO Rev.A	Samsung Exynos 4412	ARM Cortex-A9 MP4 1.4 GHz	ARM Mali-400 MP4 440 MHz	-	T-DMB
GT-I9082	international		WCDMA + GSM	Broadcom BCM 28155	ARM Cortex-A9 MP2 1.2 GHz	-	VideoCore-IV 250 MHz	FM-Radio, Dual SIM
GT-I9118	China	Open Variant	TD-SCDMA + GSM	Qualcomm Snapdragon 400 MSM8230	Qualcomm Krait 200 MP2 1.2 GHz	Adreno 305	-	FM radio, no Google Service
GT-I9128	China	China Mobile	TD-SCDMA + GSM	Qualcomm Snapdragon 400 MSM8230	Qualcomm Krait 200 MP2 1.2 GHz	Adreno 305	-	FM radio, no Google Service
GT-I9128V	China	China Mobile	WCDMA + TD-SCDMA + GSM	Qualcomm Snapdragon 400 MSM8230	Qualcomm Krait 200 MP2 1.2 GHz	Adreno 305	-	FM radio, no Google Service
SCH-I879	China	China Telecom	CDMA2000 EV-DO Rev.A + GSM	Qualcomm Snapdragon 400 MSM8230	Qualcomm Krait 200 MP2 1.2 GHz	Adreno 305	-	FM radio, no Google Service, Dual SIM
GT-I9082C	China	China Telecom	WCDMA + GSM	Broadcom BCM 28155	ARM Cortex-A9 MP2 1.2 GHz	-	VideoCore-IV 250 MHz	FM radio, no Google Service, Dual SIM

== Overclocking ==
The dual-core Cortex A9 runs at a speed of 1.2 GHz by default, but it can be overclocked to 1.3 GHz without the need of a custom kernel. This can be effected by rooting and then using a CPU clock speed modification app.

== Special editions ==
In South Korea, Samsung launched a variant of the product with a quad-core CPU at a much lower price. In India, Samsung also launched the Samsung Galaxy Grand with a free flip cover, 50GB Dropbox Storage, free My Services and a Dual-SIM slot.

== Reception ==
The Economic Times reviewed the Galaxy Grand and said in their verdict: "Great for multimedia and comes with the promise of reliable after-sales service; but otherwise isn't worth twice the cost of budget phablets with similar specs."
