= FlexEnable =

United Kingdom technology company

FlexEnable Technology Limited
- Trade name: FlexEnable
- Industry: Flexible electronics, active optics
- Headquarters: Cambridge, United Kingdom
- Key people: Mike Banach, President
- Website: www.flexenable.com

FlexEnable is a technology provider that develops flexible organic electronics technologies and organic thin-film transistor (OTFT) materials. Applications of FlexEnable's technology include active liquid crystal optics on plastic for smart glasses, as well as OTFT backplanes for flexible displays including ePaper displays and Organic LCD. The company is located on the Cambridge Science Park, just north of Cambridge city centre.

FlexEnable was spun-out of Cambridge University with a focus on replacing silicon on glass in large-area electronics with organic thin-film transistors (OTFTs) on flexible substrates, enabling optoelectronic modules which are flexible, ultra-thin, ultra-light and unbreakable. FlexEnable is bringing organic electronics technology to market in a fabless business model. It supplies OTFT materials, technology transfers, and process licenses to display manufacturers.

== Technology ==
FlexEnable's maximum processing temperature for organic thin-film transistors is below 100 °C. This low temperature allows for the use of lower-cost plastic substrates enabling low cost, high yield mount and demount approach to handling flexible substrates.

In January 2024 FlexEnable launched ambient dimming and tunable lenses evaluation kits for AR and VR glasses. Each cell is around 100 µm and lightweight, and can be biaxially curved.

The company's ambient dimming technology is aimed at all day-wearable see-through AR glasses which need active optics to ensure virtual images are clearly seen in bright sunlight. FlexEnable's dimming technology is based on liquid crystals on plastic substrates - changing the voltage, changes the orientation of the liquid crustal molecules which controls how much light is transmitted through the cell. This creates global dimming. By integrating FlexEnable's organic thin-film transistor technology into the dimming cell, only the pixels behind the virtual object can be dimmed, thus creating pixelated dimming.

FlexEnable also develops tunable-focus lenses for AR glasses. These lenses reduce vergence accommodation conflict thanks to their ability to dynamically adjust focus depending on where the eye is focusing, bringing the virtual and real world into the expected focal distance. The same technology is used for making switchable reading lenses that can be integrated into smart glasses.

In June 2024 FlexEnable announced that it has brought its OTFT technology into mass production in a first consumer product incorporating a curved OTFT-driven ePaper display with 180-degree bend, in partnership with display manufacturing companies DKE and Giantplus. In March 2026 DKE launched its DKE FLEX platform using for flexible ePaper displays built on FlexEnable's organic thin-film transistor (OTFT) technology on plastic substrates.

== See also ==
- Electronic paper
