= Enhanced GPS =

Mobile phone technology to augment GPS

E-GPS ( Enhanced GPS, EGPS, trademarked as eGPS) is a technology designed for mobile phones on GSM and W-CDMA networks, to augment GPS signals to deliver faster location fixes, lower cost implementations and reduced power and processing requirements. It is being developed by CSR who has partnered with Motorola – together they intend to create an open industry forum.

According to CSR, EGPS delivers a "universal positioning capability that will not only work reliably indoors and in zero GPS signal conditions, but greatly speed time to fix in poor GPS reception areas where most handsets are used." More specifically, it can "exploit data available from the cellular network to speed GPS fixes and provide complementary, fast, and reliable location sensing when GPS signals are weak or unavailable." CSR is hoping to add eGPS capabilities to handsets for less than $1 per unit.

E-GPS combines CSR's "Matrix" technology with GPS – when a user initiates a location request they get a Matrix location instantly using cell tower information, accurate to within 100m. Then CSR's "Fine Time Aiding" helps the device know where to look for a GPS signal, to quickly acquire satellite information within seconds. Fine Time Aiding enables a more aggressive search and is claimed to be equivalent to 6 dB more sensitivity than can be achieved by any GPS hardware correlator in the terminal.

CSR claim that this enables software-only GPS solutions to operate reliably in all environments, and that eGPS is superior to Assisted GPS. EGPS technologies are due in 2008.

eGPS is much advanced than conventional GPS system provided with enhanced location search and integrated cellular connectivity.

== Industry adoption and technological advancements ==
In 2008, CSR demonstrated its Enhanced GPS (eGPS) technology at Mobile World Congress, underlining its ability to deliver fast and accurate location data even in environments where traditional GPS signals are weak or absent. By combining cellular network information with GPS satellite data, eGPS enabled rapid location fixes and was specifically engineered to work in places like urban canyons or indoors, addressing a key pain point for mobile users. CSR’s launch of the BlueCore7 chip—which integrated Bluetooth, FM radio, and eGPS—demonstrated the potential for lower-cost, power-efficient, and multifunctional mobile solutions, making the technology highly attractive to device manufacturers. This hybrid positioning approach, recognized by industry analysts, was a critical step forward in the evolution of reliable, always-available location-based services for mobile devices. Modern iterations of the technology, specifically the GPS III satellite generation, offer a threefold increase in signal accuracy and significantly more robust protection against signal interference or jamming.

== Global systems and operation ==
While GPS is the most well-known system, it is part of a broader network of Global Navigation Satellite Systems (GNSS) that includes Europe’s Galileo, which provides enhanced positioning and timing data for international users. Assistance data can reduce the time required for a GPS receiver to acquire satellite signals, particularly in environments where satellite visibility is limited.

== Timeline ==
- February 2005 - The E-GPS system was first announced by developers CPS (Cambridge Positioning Systems Ltd)
- January 2007 - CPS is purchased by CSR, a manufacturer of bluetooth and wireless chips for mobile handsets
- January 2008 - CSR & Motorola announce that they intend to create an open industry forum for EGPS technologies
