= Samsung Galaxy Grand 2 =

Android smartphone model

- Manufacturer: Samsung Electronics
- Type: Touchscreen smartphone
- Series: Samsung Galaxy
- First released: December 2013 and January 2014 (India); February and March 2014 (Philippines)
- Predecessor: Samsung Galaxy Grand
- Successor: Samsung Galaxy Grand Max; Samsung Galaxy Grand Prime
- Compatible networks: EDGE, GPRS (850, 900, 1,800, 1,900 MHz); HSPA+ 21, 5.76 Mbit/s
- Form factor: Slate
- Weight: 162 g (5.7 oz)
- Operating system: Original: Android 4.3 "Jelly Bean" with TouchWiz Nature UX; Current: Android 4.4 "KitKat" (version 4.4.2) (last supported version) Unofficial: Up to Android 9, Lineage OS 16
- System-on-chip: ARM Cortex-A7
- CPU: 1.2 GHz quad-core processor ARM Cortex-A7 Snapdragon 400 MSM8226
- GPU: Adreno 305
- Memory: 1.5 GB RAM
- Storage: 8 GB
- Removable storage: microSD up to 64 GB
- Battery: Li-ion 2600 mAh
- Rear camera: 8 MP 1080p Full HD video recording @ 30 fps with auto-focus; self-timer; panorama; smile shot; face detection; stop motion
- Front camera: 1.9 MP
- Display: 5.25 in (13.3 cm) TFT LCD; 720×1280 px (~280 ppi)
- Connectivity: Bluetooth 4.0; micro-USB 2.0; Wi-Fi (802.11a/b/g/n); Wi-Fi Direct; FM radio with RDS; A-GPS and GLONASS
- Data inputs: Multi-touch capacitive touchscreen display; Ambient light sensors; Microphone; 3-axis magnetometer (compass); A-GPS; 3-axis accelerometer; Stereo FM Radio With RDS and Swype
- Model: SM-G7100 (single SIM); SM-G7102 (dual SIM); SM-G7105 (LTE-enabled single SIM)

The Samsung Galaxy Grand 2 is a smartphone developed by Samsung Electronics, first announced on November 25, 2013 with Google Play. The phone has a quad core 1.2 GHz processor and 1.5 GB of RAM, with an internal memory of 8 GB which can be extended to another 64 GB by use of microSD cards. The device also supports internet connectivity through 2G and 3G apart from Wi-Fi.

The Google Play Newsstand, Games, Music, Movies & TV, and Books, Navigation systems including A-GPS and GLONASS with Google Maps. The phone launched with Android 4.3 (Jelly Bean) OS. On 14 July 2014 the phone was upgraded to Android 4.4.2 KitKat by an OTA update. There were many issues related with the update. Many users were complaining about unexpected restarts, frequent freezing, System UI errors, unable to change lock screen wallpapers and more. All these issues have been resolved recently with the latest K1 build, which comes along with Samsung Knox.

== Features ==
The Galaxy Grand 2 features an 8 MP rear camera that is capable of high resolution photos and video capture. The primary camera is capable of Full HD video recording at 1920×1080p at 30 frames per second. The quality can be adjusted between HD ready to Full HD depending on the amount of space to be utilized for each video file. The camera comes with an LED flash that is capable of illuminating your subjects quite adequately even in low light conditions. The secondary front-facing camera is composed of a 1.9 MP camera. Autofocus, Geotagging, Touch Focus and Face Detection are some of the advanced features supported by the phone, as well as an image stabilizer and smile detector, and basic image editor.

The Samsung Galaxy Grand 2 is powered by a 2600 mAh Li-ion, which is capable of lasting up to 17 hours. The 5.25 in (13.3 cm) TFT HD, multi-touch screen is capable of 16 million colours.

Launched in two variants, G7102 with dual SIM card slots and G7105 with LTE network support, dual micro SIM slots and with dual standby. As compared to its former model Samsung Galaxy Grand, in terms of display, it has larger screen size, improved display resolution, and Pixel Per inch.
