= Napp Pharmaceuticals =

Pharmaceutical company in Cambridge, United Kingdom

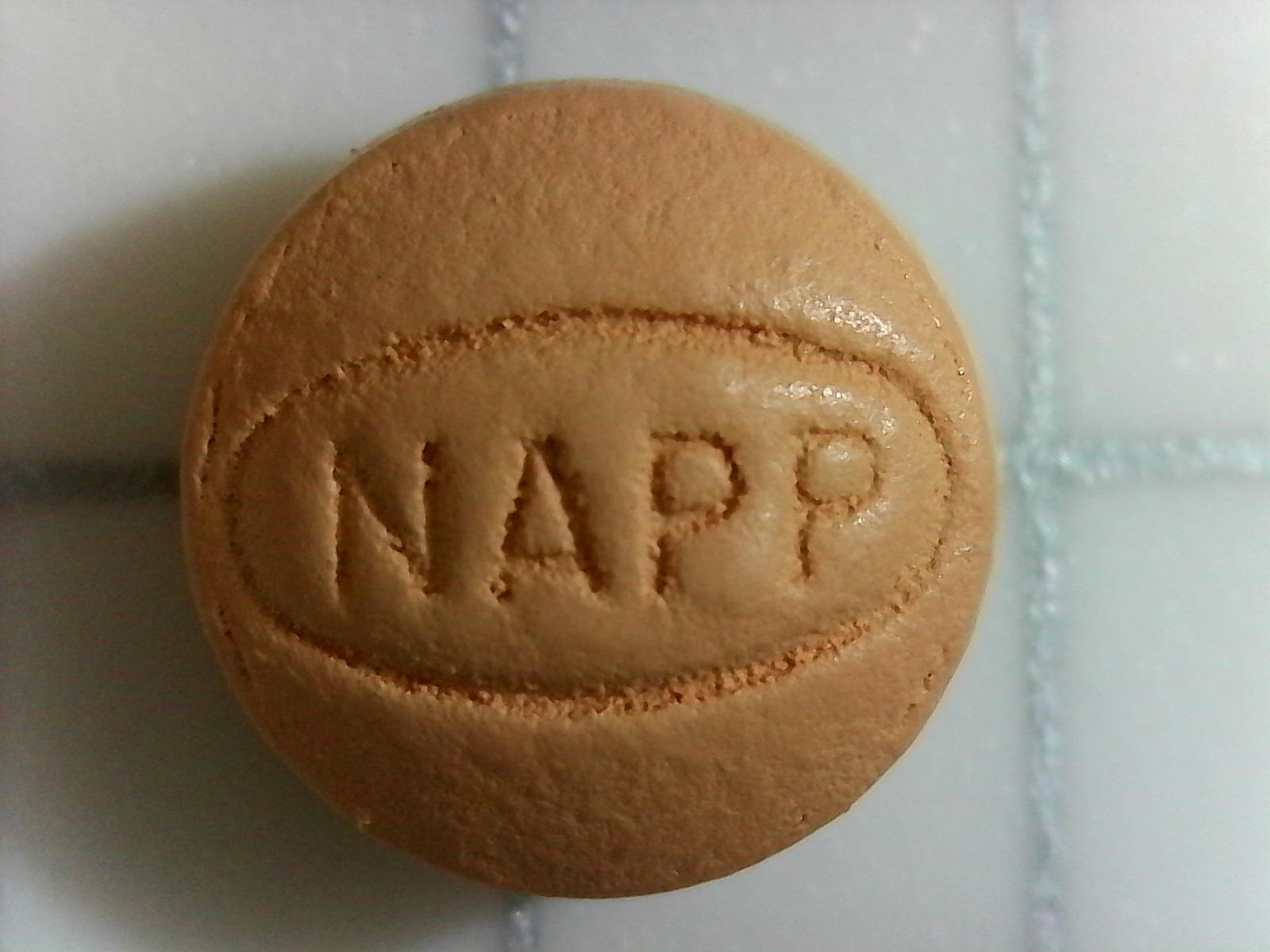
A 10mg MS Continus-branded extended-release morphine tablet displaying the Napp logo. This tablet was manufactured by Bard Pharmaceuticals Ltd, a subsidiary of Napp pharmaceuticals, and distributed by Mundipharma.

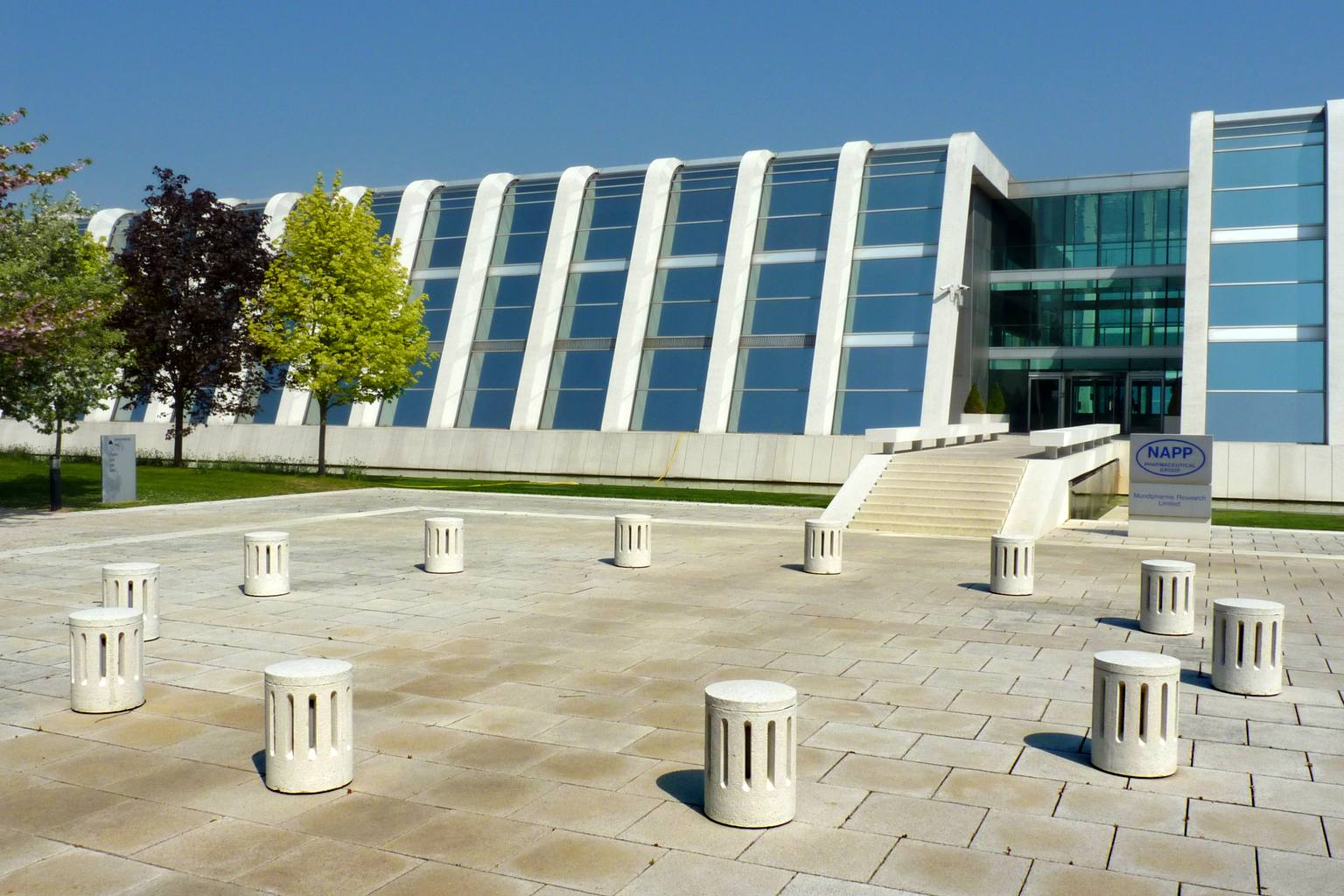
The headquarters of Napp Pharmaceuticals, located in the Cambridge Science Park

Napp Pharmaceuticals Limited is a private pharmaceutical company in Cambridge, United Kingdom. The company was founded in 1923, and bought by the Sackler family in 1966. Headquartered together with the related Napp Research Centre in the Cambridge Science Park since the 1980s, it is a sister company of Purdue Pharma and Mundipharma, all of which are owned by the descendants of Mortimer and Raymond Sackler.

== Products ==
The company produces an array of pharmaceutical products, many for pain management, among them branded forms of oxycodone that have been identified as key drugs in the opioid epidemic.

In the early 1970s, scientists at Napp developed a delivery system whereby a pill would slowly absorbed by the body, thereby continuously delivering a drug over a 12 hour period. This Continus® delivery system was used by Purdue first to introduce MST Continus in 1987 and Oxycontin eight years later.

== Explosion ==
At 7:50 AM on April 22, 1995, the chemical plant run by Napp Pharmaceuticals in the New Jersey town of Lodi exploded, causing four fatalities and a serious fire that injured over 40 others. The incident caused the evacuation of over 400 residents.

=== Cause ===
The cause of the explosion was found to be incorrectly mixed chemicals used for gold plating consumer electronics. Sodium hydrosulfite and aluminum powder were added to a large vat, but a pipe blockage prevented the next step. While clearing the blockage, water was somehow introduced to the vat, reacting with the chemicals within. A reaction began, increasing the temperature and pressure inside the vat as a noxious odour was noticed by employees, prompting the evacuation 24 hours later.

=== Injuries ===
Aware of the danger posed after consulting a company chemist, managers at the plant ordered seven workers to re-enter the plant and attempt to empty the vat of some of the chemicals. This intervention came too late however as the vat exploded, instantly killing three of the seven workers, with the other three seriously injured and one dying in the hospital a week later. The blast and fire caused injuries to 40 people.

=== Penalty ===
A federal investigation eventually fined Napp $127,000 for numerous safety violations. Manslaughter charges were considered, but ultimately state prosecutors declined to press criminal charges.

== Competition case law ==
In 2001, the Office of Fair Trading in the UK found that Napp had abused its dominant position in the market for the supply of sustained release morphine tablets and capsules, contrary to competition law. Napp's subsequent appeal against the OFT decision resulted in a legal ruling confirming that in competition law cases, the standard of proof is the civil standard ("beyond reasonable doubt") subject, because of the financial penalties involved, to a heightened requirement that strong and compelling evidence commensurate with the seriousness of the case against an alleged offender must be found.
