= The Queen's Award for Enterprise: Innovation (Technology) (2005) =

The Queen's Award for Enterprise: Innovation (Technology) (2005) was awarded on 21 April 2005, by Queen Elizabeth II.

== Recipients ==
The following organisations were awarded this year.

- AGD Systems Limited of Cheltenham, Gloucestershire for Pedestrian detection using digital vision technology.
- Air Bearings Limited of Poole, Dorset for Ultra high speed air bearing PCB drilling spindles.
- apetito Ltd of Trowbridge, Wiltshire for Provision of food to the elderly.
- Apollo Chemicals Limited of Tamworth, Staffordshire for 'Fast-tack' solvent free contact adhesive.
- Autotype International Limited of Wantage, Oxfordshire for Formable hardcoatings for use in the decoration of injection mouldings (In mould decoration).
- Avent, the Baby Products Division of Cannon Avent Group Plc of Glemsford, Sudbury, Suffolk for Breast milk feeding range for working mothers.
- B&W Loudspeakers Limited of Worthing, West Sussex for Tube loading to loudspeaker drive units.
- Bionics Corporation Ltd, trading as Broadcast Bionics of Haywards Heath, West Sussex for PhoneBOX, TV/Radio studio telephone call routing system.
- Cableflow International Limited of High Wycombe, for Buckinghamshire TECHNOTRUNK MEDISYS integra – Bedhead Services Trunking System.
- Carton Edge Systems Ltd of Coventry, for the Eco-Edge TM system for applying biodegradable serrated cutting edges to kitchen foil and film cartons.
- Checkprint Limited of Hinckley, Leicestershire for Software solutions in cheque handling.
- Colin Stewart Minchem Ltd of Winsford, Cheshire for Research, development and production of detergent intermediates.
- Corniche Fine Arts Limited of Bridlington, East Riding of for Yorkshire 'DotMatch' flexographic wet proofing.
- Datix Limited of London SW19 for Risk management and patient safety software (Healthcare).
- DiGiCo UK Limited of Chessington, Surrey for Design of digital mixing consoles for live applications.
- FilmLight Ltd of London WC1 for Northlight – digital film scanner for the motion picture industry.
- Fujitsu Telecommunications Europe Limited of Birmingham for GeoStream Access Gateway for delivering broadband services throughout the UK.
- John Guest International Limited of West Drayton, Middlesex for Speedfit plastic plumbing fittings and pipe.
- Inca Digital Printers Ltd of Cambridge for Industrial digital flatbed inkjet printers.
- Interface Fabrics Ltd of Mirfield, West Yorkshire for design innovation in performance contract textiles.
- KROHNE Ltd of Wellingborough, for Northamptonshire 'OPTIMASS' Coriolis mass flow metering of fluids for process engineering industries.
- Martek Marine Ltd of Rotherham, South Yorkshire for BULKSAFE water ingress detection system for bulk carrier ships.
- Norprint Labelling Systems Limited of Boston, Lincolnshire for Nortag – lightweight acousto magnetic retail security swing tag which increases product security.
- Alan Nuttall Ltd – Fresh Food Solutions of Hinckley, Leicestershire for hot food display technology.
- PIPS Technology Ltd of Chandler's Ford, Eastleigh, for Hampshire Spike – Integrated number plate capture and analysis.
- Pipeshield International Limited of Lowestoft, SuVolk for Specialised protection and support systems for marine/oVshore structures and pipelines.
- Retail Logic Ltd of Fleet, Hampshire for Smart-Solution providing retailers with an upgrade path to Chip and PIN card processing.
- RiskSTOP Ltd of Dorchester, Dorset for ASSIST risk management tool.
- SiS (Science in Sport) Limited of Old Langho, Blackburn for Isotonic energy gel, for use by athletes, sports people and high expenders of energy.
- Safeglass (Europe) Limited of East Kilbride, Glasgow, for Scotland Safeglass> – polymer that mimics glass.
- ScotAsh Limited of Kincardine-on-Forth, Fife, Scotland for re-engineering and re-use of power station ash in value-added construction products.
- ScrewFast Foundations Ltd of St Albans, Hertfordshire for specialist high speed, concrete free foundation system for buildings, masts and tall structures.
- Selenia Communications Limited of Chelmsford, Essex for H4855 personal role radio for use by frontline troops.
- Sibelius Software Ltd of London N4 for Sibelius music notation software for writing and teaching music.
- Sterling Power Products Limited of Worcester for Integrated Mobile Power Supply System.
- Surrey Satellite Technology Ltd of Guildford, Surrey for highly advanced, low cost, nano-, micro- and minisatellites.
- TMD Technologies Ltd of Hayes, Middlesex for ultra low noise free range power supply for Doppler radar.
- TPA Trax Portable Access Limited of Worksop, Nottinghamshire for design and performance of portable roadways.
- The Training Foundation Ltd of Coventry for best-practice generic training skills programme – Trainer Assessment Programme (TAP>).
- Visualfiles Limited of Headingley, Leeds for design of legal case and matter management software.
- Xaar plc of Cambridge for development of piezo-inkjet printheads.
