= King Sturge =

International property consultancy

King Sturge LLP
- Company type: Private
- Industry: Real estate
- Founded: 1992
- Defunct: 2011
- Fate: Acquired
- Successor: JLL
- Headquarters: Warwick Street, London, United Kingdom
- Products: Property management, property consulting
- Number of employees: 1,600 (2010)
- Website: www.kingsturge.com at the Wayback Machine (archived 2011-01-29)

King Sturge LLP was a British property management and consultancy company with over 210 offices and 4,200 staff in 45 countries. It operated throughout the UK and Europe and had associations and partners in Asia Pacific and North, Central and South America. The firm covered all property sectors and related services such as logistics, plant and machinery.

The firm was formed in 1992 from the merger of King and Co, founded in 1918, and JP Sturge, which can trace its corporate roots back to 1760. In May 2011, King Sturge was purchased by JLL for £197 million.

== History ==
=== The Sturges ===
In 1760, a farmer named John Player, of Stoke Gifford near Bristol began surveying for mapping. Although still relatively crude, surveying became increasingly important as the enclosure of common land progressed in the early nineteenth century. In 1772 Player was joined by his nephew Jacob Sturge forming the partnership, “Player and Sturge”, who ran their surveying business from Red House Farm in Coombe Dingle, Bristol. Jacob and Mary Sturge's elder son, Young Sturge, born 1781, left his father's country practice in 1799, having agreed to take over the land measuring and planning aspects of the business, and set up an office in Small Street, Bristol,

The rise of Bristol was partly due to the slave trade, but the city was the first to set up an abolition committee in 1788. Although the slave trade was abolished in 1807, slavery itself was not abolished until 1833. Abolition was in part due to a member of the Quaker Sturge family, Joseph Sturge, who led the campaign for abolition in Birmingham.

In 1811, Jacob Sturge died and in 1814 his younger son, Jacob Player Sturge joined his brother, Young Sturge, in partnership as “Y and JP Sturge, Land Agents and Surveyors”. Initially most of its business was with the enclosure of common land and the surveying of parish and private land.

William Sturge, JP Sturge's eldest son, entered the office in 1836 at the age of 16. He became a partner at the age of 22 in 1842. Following the death of Young Sturge in 1844, the firm became JP Sturge & Son, becoming JP Sturge & Sons after William's younger brothers, Walter and Robert, also became partners.

The Great Western Railway was the most significant opportunity for Bristol at this time as it needed the railway to compete with Liverpool and Manchester. Central to the project for the station in Bristol was the purchase of Temple Meads in 1838 for which JP Sturge advised the city corporation.

The Surveyors’ Institution (which became the Royal Institution of Chartered Surveyors) was founded in 1868 by 20 members of the Land Surveyors’ Club (founded in 1834, whose membership was primarily agriculture-based on the work of Enclosure and Tithes Commutation) Only three of the founders were from outside London, including William Sturge who became president of the Institution in 1878.

Before William Sturge's death in 1905 his nephew, Theodore Sturge, and his grandson, Frederick Allen Sturge Goodbody, had joined the firm, as none of William's sons wished to be surveyors. Theodore was the last Sturge to become a partner.

In 1976 Philip Franklin (senior partner of JP Sturge) who had joined the firm in 1938 aged 17 and returned from war service in 1947 became President of the RICS.

=== The Kings ===
In 1920, with his war pension and a small government gratuity, Herbert James King set up business in Winchmore Hill, North London. The business, called King & Co, traded as “Surveyors, Auctioneers, Valuers and Estate Agents”. Initially, it was primarily residential based, and included auctions at the London Auction Mart of both properties and contents.

In 1925 King & Co, recognising the potential in commercial property, moved to Clement's Inn, Strand, adjoining the Law Courts. By 1928 the firm had a turnover of £2,991/1s/6d and a profit of £1,032/5s (£138,000 and £48,000 in 2010 terms).

Douglas James King joined the family firm in 1939 and became senior partner in 1959. Malcolm King joined King & Co in 1970, establishing the new investment department. Colin Marsden joined King & Co in 1959 from Stiles Horton Ledger in Brighton and become joint senior partner with Malcolm King.

=== King Sturge ===
Following discussions between Ned Cussen and Malcolm King, King & Co and JP Sturge merged in 1992. Malcolm King developed both the UK and international businesses, with an ownership structure in Europe and associations elsewhere. He retired as senior partner in 2005, ending an 85-year, three generation, family leadership.

Malcolm King was succeeded by Chris Ireland and Richard Batten as joint senior partners. Ireland joined King & Co in 1979 and dealt with the major institutions and property companies. Richard Batten joined in 1982 after a commission in the army and headed the professional services group, having expertise in the banking and corporate finance sectors.

Max Crofts was then elected President of RICS becoming the third Surveyors Institution/RICS President from King Sturge or their previous incarnations.

== Archives ==
Many maps and plans dating between 1799 and 1947, drawn by the Sturge surveyors, are held at Bristol Archives (Ref. 31965[STG]), as well as maps, surveys, deeds, particulars of sale, land stewards' reports, accounts and papers of the company dated between 1672 and 1918 (Ref. 32395).
