= Domino Printing Sciences =

UK business

Domino Printing Sciences PLC
- Industry: Industrial printers; Coding; Marking serialisation; Traceability
- Founded: 1978; 48 years ago
- Founder: Graeme Minto
- Headquarters: Cambridge, United Kingdom
- Key people: Robert Pulford (Group Managing Director); Rachel Hurst (Group Operations Director)
- Products: PALM (print and apply labelers), UV inkjet industrial printers, CIJ (continuous inkjet industrial printers), TIJ (thermal inkjet printers), CO2 laser coders, Piezo DOD (drop on demand) printers, fiber laser coders, coding automation software, QuickDesign production line controllers
- Number of employees: Approx. 2,800 (2020)
- Parent: Brother Industries
- Subsidiaries: Citronix, Graph-Tech AG, Domino Print and Apply (Mectec Elektronik AB until 2016), PostJet Systems Ltd., Wiedenbach Apparatebau GmbH
- Website: domino-printing.com

Domino Printing Sciences PLC is a British-based developer of industrial and commercial inkjet printing, thermal transfer printing, print and apply machines, digital printing presses and laser printing products. It was listed on the London Stock Exchange until it was acquired by Brother Industries in 2015.

== History ==
The company was founded by Graeme Minto in 1978 to exploit continuous inkjet technology (CIJ). By 1984 Domino had shipped its 1000th printer. It was first listed as DNO on the London Stock Exchange in 1985. In 1989 Domino moved to a new headquarters, located a few miles from Cambridge. In 1994 it acquired Directed Energy, a small laser marking business based in California, United States. In 2004 it acquired Wiedenbach, a supplier of ink jet printers, and Purex, a supplier of fume extractors for laser printers. In 2005, it acquired Sator, a supplier of laser printers. In 2006 it acquired Enterprise Information Systems, an RFID specialist.

In March 2015 Japan's Brother Industries announced it planned to buy Domino Printing Sciences PLC for £1.03 billion in cash ($1.55 billion).

CEO Nigel Bond retired in March 2019 and was replaced by Robert Pulford, previously managing director of Domino’s Digital Printing Solutions Division.
