= VideoCore =

Low-power mobile multimedia processor

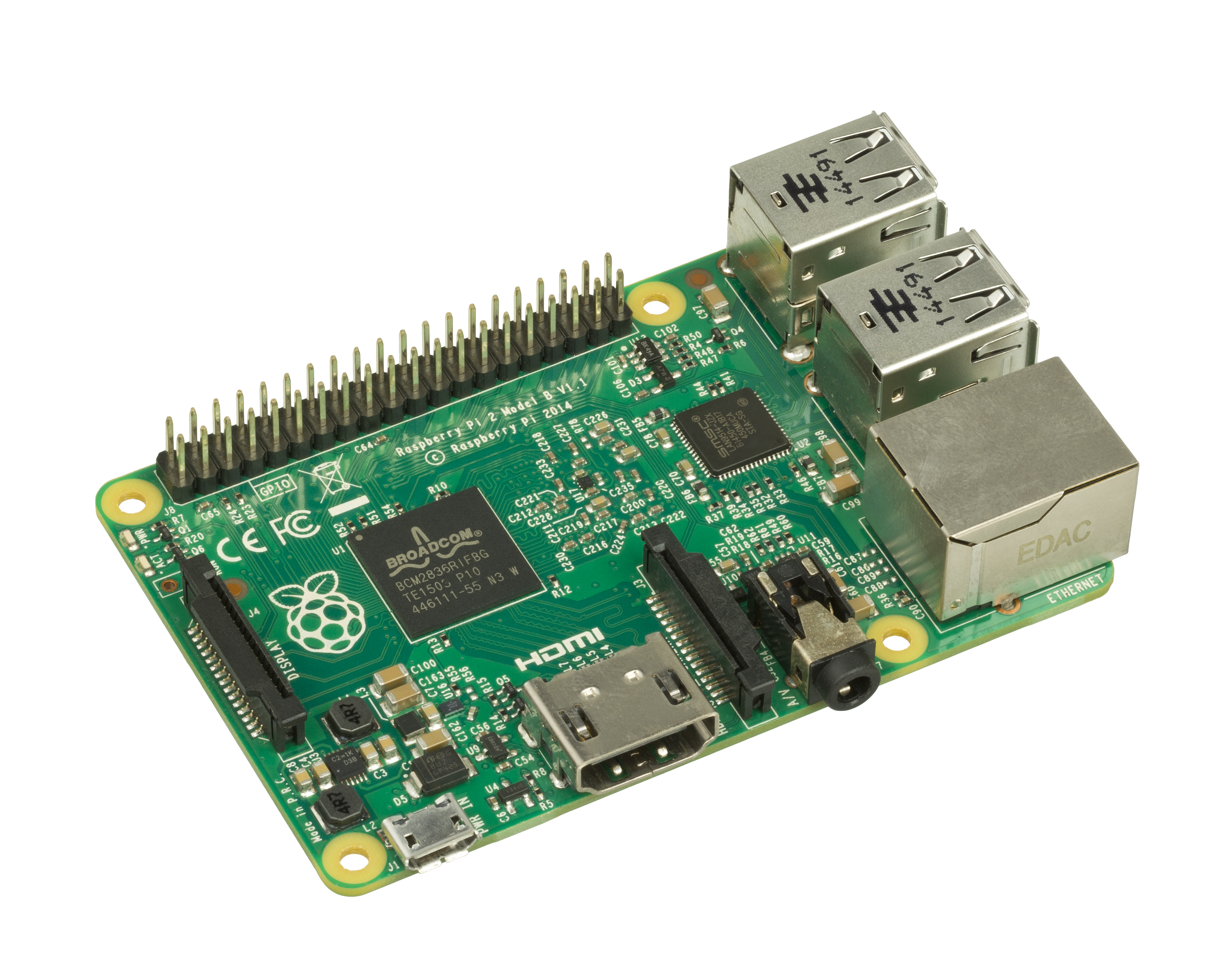
A Broadcom VideoCore processor powers the line of popular Raspberry Pi micro-computers.

VideoCore is a series of low-power mobile multimedia processors originally developed by Alphamosaic Ltd and now owned by Broadcom. Alphamosaic marketed its first version as a two-dimensional DSP architecture that makes it flexible and efficient enough to decode (as well as encode) a number of multimedia codecs in software while maintaining low power usage. The semiconductor intellectual property core (SIP core) has been found so far only on Broadcom SoCs.

== Technical details ==
=== Multimedia system constraints ===
Mobile multimedia devices require a lot of high-speed video processing but at low power for long battery life. The ARM processor core has a high IPS per watt figure (and thus dominates the mobile phone market) but requires video acceleration coprocessors and display controllers for a complete system. The amount of data passing between these chips at high speed results in higher power consumption. Specialised co-processors may be optimised for throughput over latency (more cores and data parallelism, but at a lower clock speed) and have instruction-sets and memory architectures designed for media processing (e.g. saturation arithmetic, and handling of specialised data formats).

=== 3D engine ===
The VideoCoreIV-AG100-R found in the Raspberry Pi 1, 2 and 3, is documented to fully support OpenGL ES 2.0 and OpenVG 1.1.

The 3D engine is composed of various subsystems, the most abundant being the QPUs. A QPU is a 16-way single instruction, multiple data (SIMD) processor.

"Each processor has two vector floating-point ALUs which carry out multiply and non-multiply operations in parallel with single instruction cycle latency. Internally the QPU is a 4-way SIMD processor multiplexed 4× over four cycles, making it particularly suited to processing streams of quads of pixels," according to Broadcom's VideoCore® IV 3D Architecture Reference Guide.

"QPUs are organized into groups of up to four, termed slices, which share certain common resources," the document continues. cf. Vertex and shader.

These "slices" correspond roughly to AMD's Compute Units.

At least VC 4 (e.g. in the Raspberry Pi) does not support S3 Texture Compression (S3TC). It probably also does not support Adaptive Scalable Texture Compression (ASTC).

=== Video compression algorithms ===
Of video compression algorithms currently in wide use, such as H.263, H.264/MPEG-4 AVC, MPEG-4, MPEG-2, MPEG-1, H.265, Daala, Theora, VP8 and VP9, Broadcom's VideoCore products support hardware acceleration of some operations. In some cases only decompression, only compression or both up to a certain resolution (e.g. 720p or 1080p) and up to a certain frame rate (e.g. 30 or 60 frames per second).

=== VideoCore key features ===
- Instruction set written with video processing in mind from the start. For example, saturation arithmetic so that the sum of two bright pixels does not 'wrap around' into dark values.
- An array of graphics processing units for parallel computing of video data at relatively low clock speed.
- Very high integration puts CPU, GPUs, memory and display circuitry on a single chip, removing the power burden of driving fast off-chip buses.

=== Variants ===
The VideoCore I-based VC01 provides video and multimedia capabilities to various Samsung phones, including SCH-V540, SCH-V4200, SCH-V490.

The VideoCore II-based VC02 / BCM2722 processor provides video capabilities for Apple's 5th generation iPod.

The VideoCore III-based BCM2727 processor provides video, still and 3D graphics capabilities for the Nokia N8.

The VideoCore IV BCM2763 processor improves on the VideoCore III with support for 1080p encode and decode, along with higher resolution camera support and faster 2D and 3D graphics, all at very low power. It is used in the Nokia 808 PureView, some versions of Roku hardware and the Raspberry Pi (2835/2836 models for versions 1/2 accordingly).

The VideoCore IV BCM28155 processor supports for 1080p encode and decode, improved 2D and 3D graphics with dual-core ARM Cortex-A9 CPU in BCM28155 chipset. It is used in the Samsung Galaxy S II Plus, Samsung Galaxy Grand and Amazon Fire TV Stick.

The VideoCore V BCM7251 processor supports 2160p60 decode and transcode or dual 1080p60 encode/decode, features improved codec support (H.265), DDR3 and DDR4 support, USB 3.0, PCIe, Gigabit Ethernet and 802.11ac on a dual-core ARM Cortex-A15 Brahma15 dual core CPU.

=== Table of SoCs adopting VideoCore SIP blocks ===
SoC	GPU		CPU			Max display	Utilizing devices
SoC	Architecture	Freq. (MHz)	Architecture	Cores	Freq. (MHz)	Max display	Utilizing devices
VC01	VideoCore I		None			CIF	List: Samsung SCH-V490, Samsung SCH-V420, Samsung SCH-V450, Samsung SCH-V4200, Samsung SCH-V540, Samsung SCH-X699,
BCM2702 (VC02)	VideoCore II		None			SD	List: TCL D308, TCL D918, Samsung SPH-B3100, Samsung SPH-P730, Sandisk v-mate, BenQ S700, O2 X3, Nintendo Play-Yan, Sagem MyMobileTV
BCM2705 (VC05)	VideoCore II		None			SD	
BCM2091	VideoCore IV		None			Unspecified	
BCM2722	VideoCore II		None			SD	iPod (5th gen.)
BCM2724	VideoCore II		None			SD	
BCM2727	VideoCore III		None			720p	Nokia N8
BCM11181	VideoCore III		None			720p	List: Persona Tablet, Hikari iFrame
BCM2763	VideoCore IV		None			1080p	List: Nokia 600, Nokia 700, Nokia 701, Nokia 603, Nokia 808
BCM2820	VideoCore IV		ARM1176	1	600	1080p	
BCM2835	VideoCore IV	250	ARM1176	1	700	1080p	List: Raspberry Pi, Roku 2 XS
BCM2836	VideoCore IV	250	Cortex-A7	4	900	1080p (Note: Editing /boot/config.txt can yield higher resolutions by changing scan count and pixel clocks (i.e. 2560x1080))	Raspberry Pi 2
BCM2837	VideoCore IV	300	Cortex-A53	4	1200	1080p	Raspberry Pi 3
BCM11182	VideoCore IV		None			1080p	
BCM11311	VideoCore IV		Cortex-A9	2		1080p	
BCM21654	VideoCore IV		Cortex-A9 + Cortex-R4	1+1		1080p	Samsung Galaxy Fame
BCM21654G	VideoCore IV		Cortex-A9	1	>1200	720p	
BCM21663	VideoCore IV		Cortex-A9	1	>1200	720p	List: K-Touch W68, K-Touch W70
BCM21664	VideoCore IV		Cortex-A9	1	>1000	720p	
BCM21664T	VideoCore IV		Cortex-A9	1	>1200	1080p	List: Samsung Galaxy Ace Style, Samsung Galaxy Trend Plus (GT-S7580), Samsung Galaxy S Duos 2
BCM28150	VideoCore IV		Cortex-A9	2		1080p	
BCM21553	VideoCore IV		ARM11	1		1080p	List: Samsung Galaxy Y, Samsung Wave Y, Samsung Galaxy Mini, Samsung Galaxy Ace, Vodafone Smart 2
BCM28145/28155	VideoCore IV		Cortex-A9	2	1200	1080p	List: Samsung Galaxy SII Plus, Samsung Galaxy Grand, Samsung Galaxy Core Plus, Samsung Galaxy S Duos 2, Amazon Fire TV Stick
BCM23550	VideoCore IV		Cortex-A7	4	1200	1080p	List: HTC Desire 601 Dual SIM, XOLO Opus-HD, Samsung Galaxy Grand Neo, K-Touch W96, K-Touch W98
BCM7251 (archive.org)	VideoCore V		Cortex-A15	2	1666	4K	
BCM2711B0	VideoCore VI	500	Cortex-A72	4	1800	Dual, 4K	Raspberry Pi 4B
BCM2712	VideoCore VII	800	Cortex-A76	4	2400	Dual, 4K	Raspberry Pi 5
SoC	Architecture	Freq. (MHz)	Architecture	Cores	Freq. (MHz)	Max display	Utilizing devices
SoC	GPU		CPU			Max display	Utilizing devices

== VideoCore products ==
VideoCore chips can run complete applications – DSP chips are not simply just video DSP chips that require a separate processor to supply and collect data. The VideoCore may also not be optimally power-efficient at non-DSP tasks, but may be coupled with a highly efficient CPU core. For instance, typical non-multimedia tasks rarely require more than 32-bit bus width, while the VideoCore design employs multiple wide-bus-width cores.

The video decoding was offloaded onto a video accelerator board using a BCM chip.

Blu-ray players can also use it as a low-power video accelerator.

Noting that VideoCore chips were usually used with ARM-based chips, the latest chips have VideoCore and ARM processors.

== Linux support ==
On 28 February 2014, on the day of the second anniversary of the Raspberry Pi, Broadcom, together with the Raspberry Pi Foundation, announced the release of full documentation for the VideoCore IV graphics core, and a complete source release of the graphics stack under a 3-clause BSD license.

However, only a minor part of the driver was released as open source; all of the video acceleration is done using a firmware coded for its proprietary GPU, which was not open sourced. The entire SoC itself is managed by a ThreadX-based RTOS that is loaded into the VideoCore's VPU during bootup.

An architectural overview of the VideoCore based system was compiled (based on reverse engineering & patent research) by Herman Hermitage and is available on GitHub.

In June 2014, Emma Anholt left Intel for Broadcom to develop a free driver (DRM/KMS driver and Gallium3D-driver) for VC4 (VideoCore 4). After one week, she reported noteworthy progress.

I've taken on a new role as an open source developer there. I'm going to be working on building an MIT-licensed Mesa 3D and kernel DRM driver for the 2708 (aka the 2835), the chip that's in the Raspberry Pi.

The freely licensed 3D graphics code was committed to Mesa on 29 August 2014, and was first released as part of Mesa 10.3.

=== Compute Kernel programming ===
The open source community has produced a C++ library called V3DLib for directly running custom compute kernels on the VideoCore GPU on all Raspberry Pi's. This allows general-purpose computing on graphics processing units (GPGPU) which is not limited by OpenGL's graphics-oriented API.

== Market competitors ==
Similar mobile multimedia chip ranges include Adreno, Texas Instruments OMAP, Nvidia Tegra, AllWinner A1X and Freescale i.MX. These are ARM-based with arrays of graphics processing units.

== Data sources ==
The Broadcom YouTube page has videos demonstrating the video processing capability, but their website only goes as far as providing product briefs. Detailed data and development tools are only available under NDA, and then only for manufacturers with a market for very many units.

== See also ==
- Broadcom Crystal HD
