= Xaar plc =

- Company type: Public
- Traded as: LSE: XAR
- Industry: Printheads
- Founded: 1990
- Headquarters: Cambridge, UK
- Key people: Andrew Herbert, (Chairman); John Mills, (CEO)
- Revenue: ▲£60.1 million (2025)
- Operating income: ▲£1.1 million (2025)
- Net income: ▲£(3.4) million (2025)
- Total assets: ▼£78.3 million (2025)
- Total equity: ▼£56.3 million (2025)
- Subsidiaries: EPS
- Website: www.xaar.com

Xaar plc is a company supplying industrial inkjet printheads and is based in Cambridge. It is listed on the London Stock Exchange.

== History ==
The company was established in 1990 as a result of an ink jet research project funded by AMI. Xaar became listed on the London Stock Exchange in October 1997 and went on to win The Queen's Award for Innovation for the development of piezo-inkjet printheads in 2005.

== Operations ==
Xaar have developed the technology behind the Xerox Colorgrafx wide-format printer.
