= Cambridge Science Park =

Science park located in Cambridge, United Kingdom

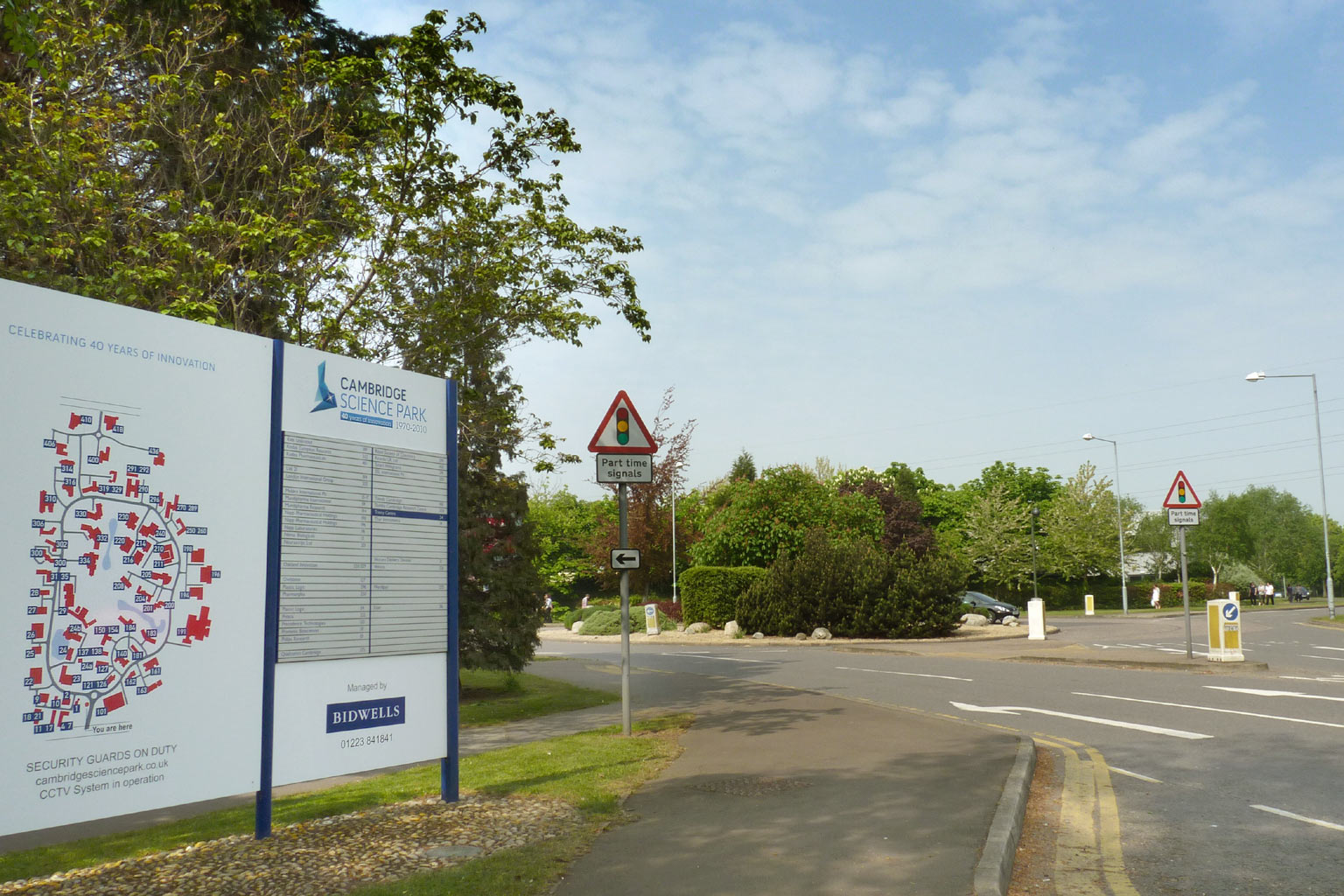
- The main entrance to Cambridge Science Park
- Interactive map of Cambridge Science Park
- Location: Milton, Cambridge
- Coordinates: 52°14′2″N 0°8′40″E
- Opening date: Autumn 1973
- Developer: Bidwells
- Manager: Bidwells
- Owner: Trinity College, Cambridge, Trinity Hall, Cambridge
- No. of tenants: 90
- Size: 173 acres (70 ha)
- Website: www.cambridgesciencepark.co.uk

The Cambridge Science Park, founded by Trinity College in 1970, is the oldest science park in the United Kingdom. It is a concentration of science and technology related businesses, and has strong links with the nearby University of Cambridge.

The science park is situated about 2 miles (3 km) to the north of Cambridge city centre, by junction 33 of the A14, in the parish of Milton, contiguous with Cambridge itself. The park is served by Cambridge North railway station and by the Cambridgeshire Guided Busway. It is directly adjacent to St John's Innovation Centre and Cambridge Business Park.

== History ==
The land was originally given to Trinity College when the latter was founded by Henry VIII in 1546. The land was used for farming until the Second World War, when it was requisitioned by the US Army and used to prepare vehicles and tanks for D-Day. After the war, the land was left derelict until 1970, when, at the suggestion of Tony Cornell, and under the supervision of Sir John Bradfield, the college worked with Sir Francis Pemberton of Bidwells to develop it into a new centre for scientific enterprise and innovation.

In 2017, following decades of rapid expansion in Cambridge, the park appointed its first director and announced a large investment intended to improve facilities and reduce traffic congestion.

== Notable companies ==
As of July 2026, 173 companies have offices on Cambridge Science Park, including park amenities. Notable ones are listed below.

=== Bio-medical ===
- Amgen
- Astex
- Bayer
- British American Tobacco
- Dr. Reddy's Laboratories
- IQVIA
- Mundipharma
- Merck Group
- Napp Research Centre
- Royal Society of Chemistry
- Sigma-Aldrich
- Veranova

=== Computer/telecoms ===
- Arthur D. Little
- AMD
- Broadcom
- Citrix Systems
- Cryptomathic
- Dassault Systèmes
- DisplayLink
- FlexEnable
- Frontier Developments
- Huawei
- Jagex
- Linguamatics
- Microsoft
- Ricardo plc
- Raspberry Pi Holdings
- Toshiba
- Vix Technology

=== Industrial technology ===
- Aveva
- Beko
- Heraeus
- Johnson Matthey
- Philips
- Roku, Inc.
- Xaar plc

=== Other ===
- Cambridge Assessment
- Cambridge Consultants
- Endomag
- Worldpay

== Cambridge Fun Run ==
The Cambridge Fun Run is a charity race for Children in Need organised and mainly entered by employees of businesses based in and around the Science Park. It has been held each November since 1989. Contestants compete in teams of four, some in fancy dress, running either one lap (as a group) or four laps (as a relay) of the 1.1 miles (1.8 km) Science Park ring road. The race begins and ends, and medals and trophies are awarded (for fastest runners and best costumes) in front of the Cambridge Consultants building.

== Gallery ==
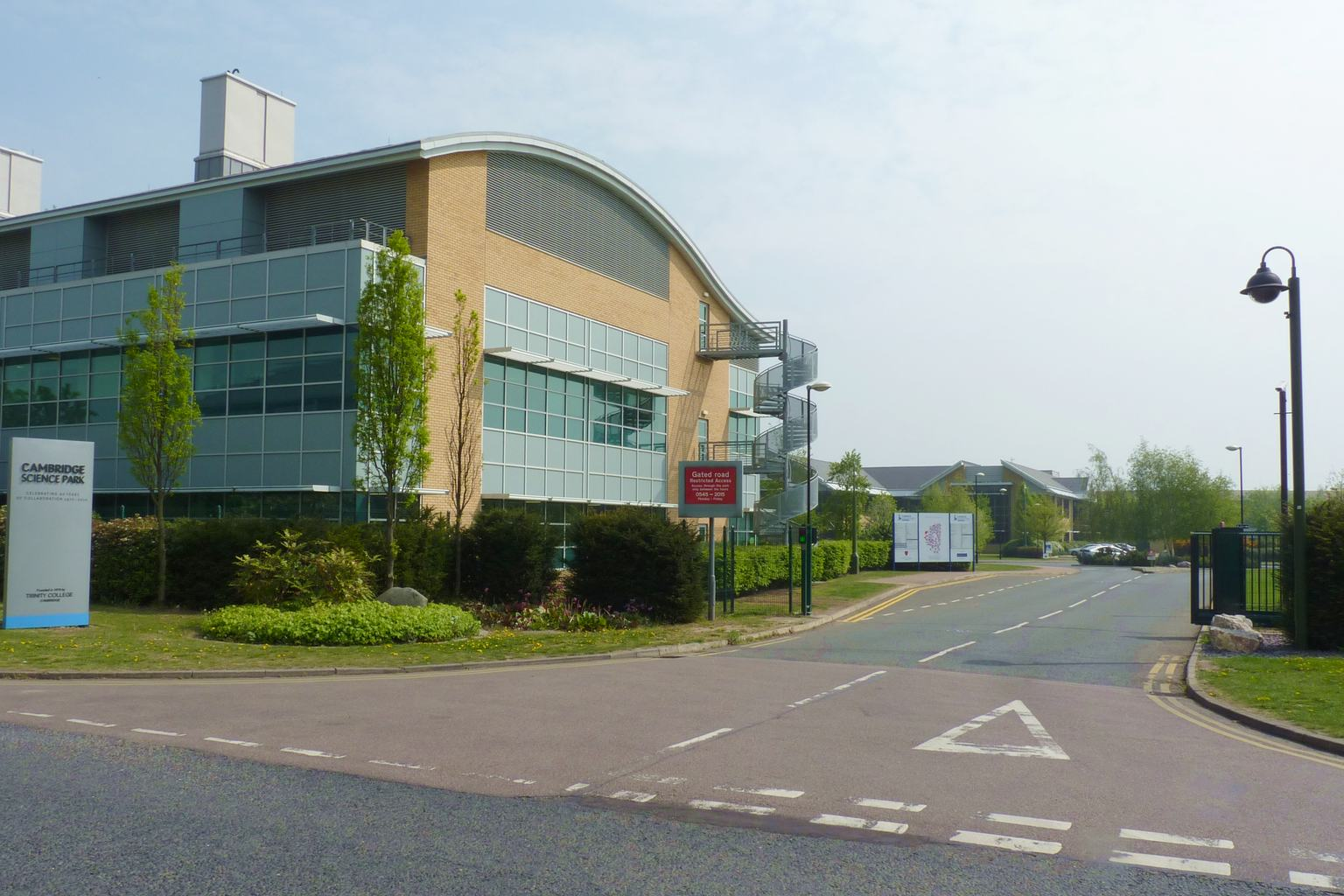
The rear entrance

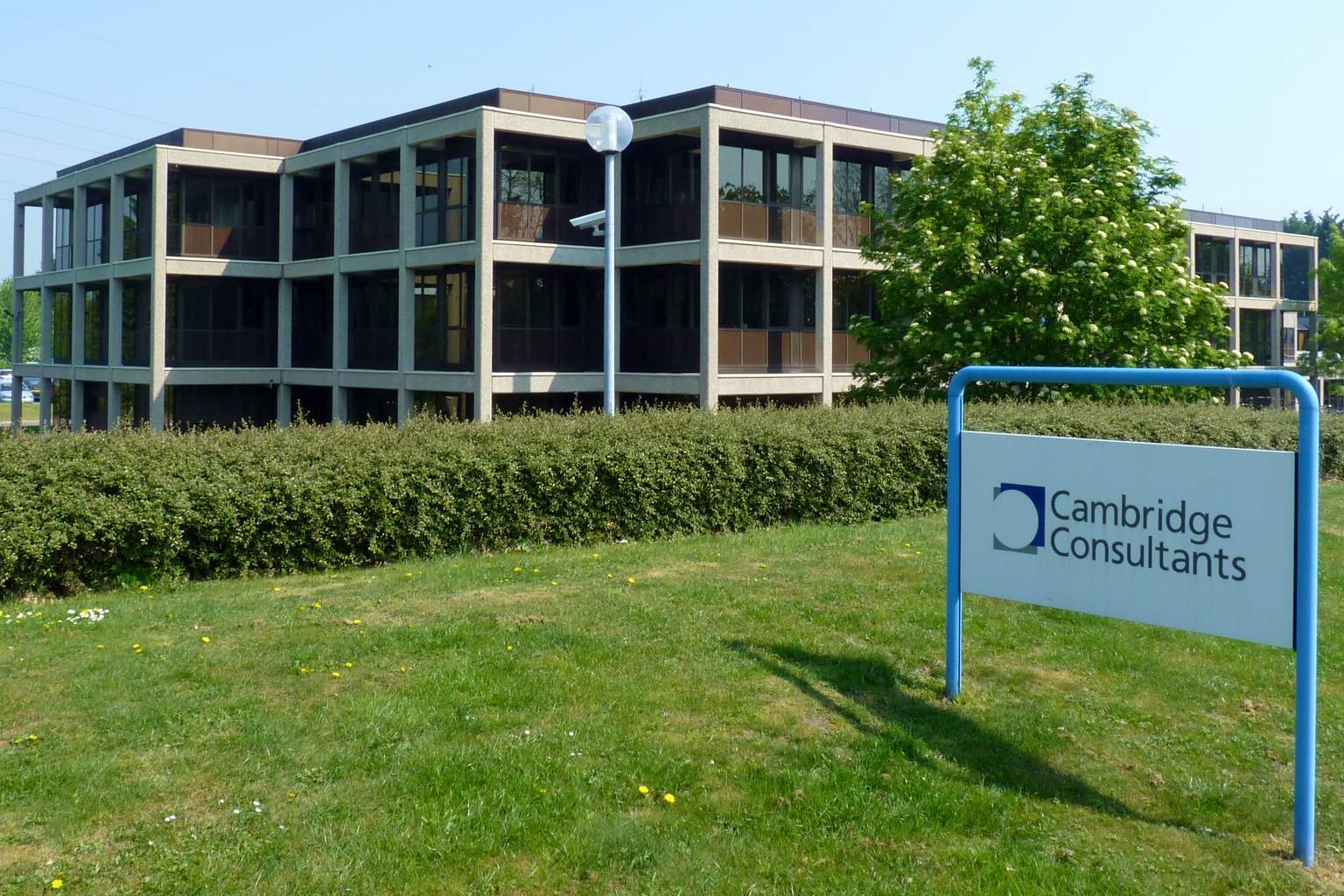
The Cambridge Consultants building

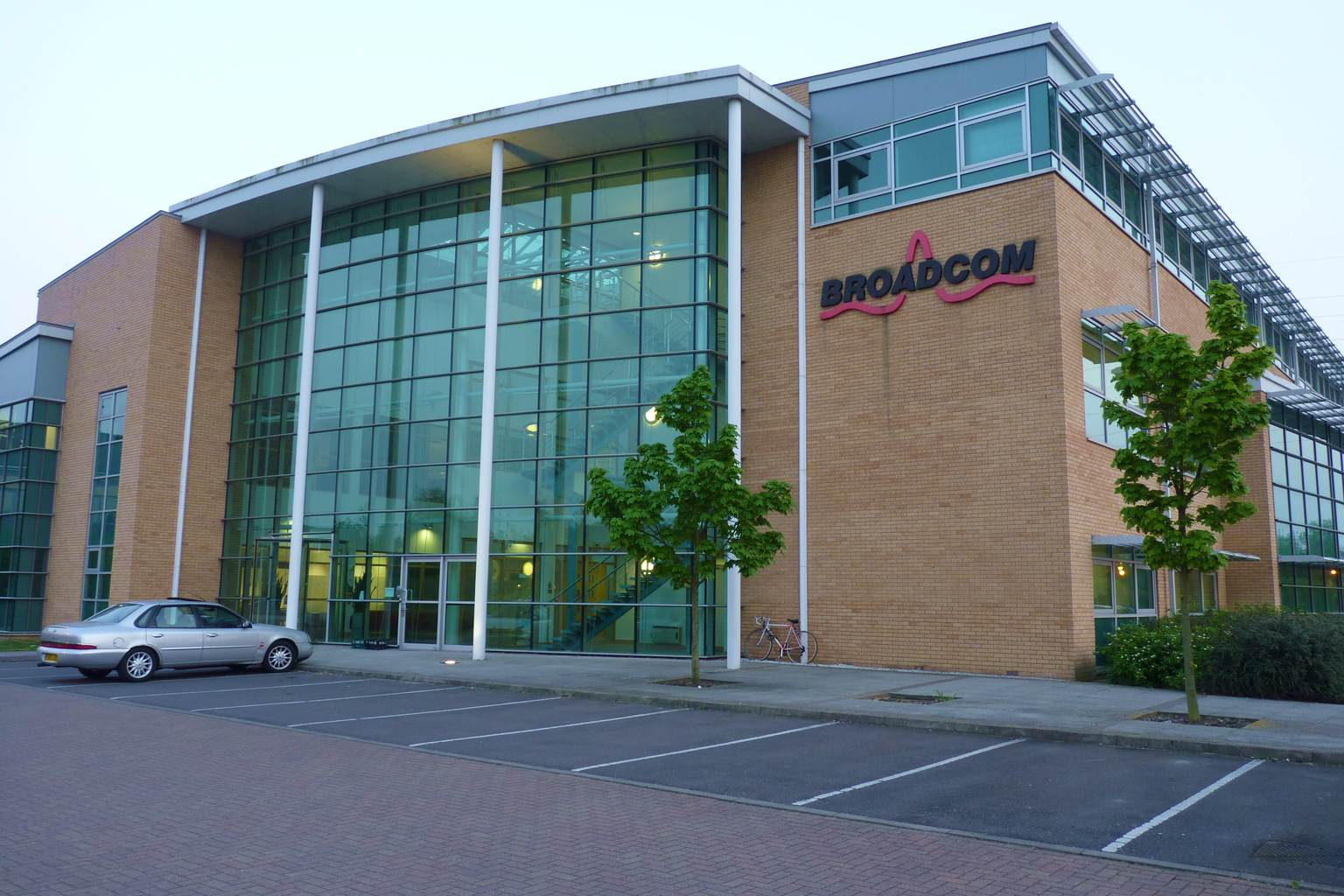
The Broadcom building

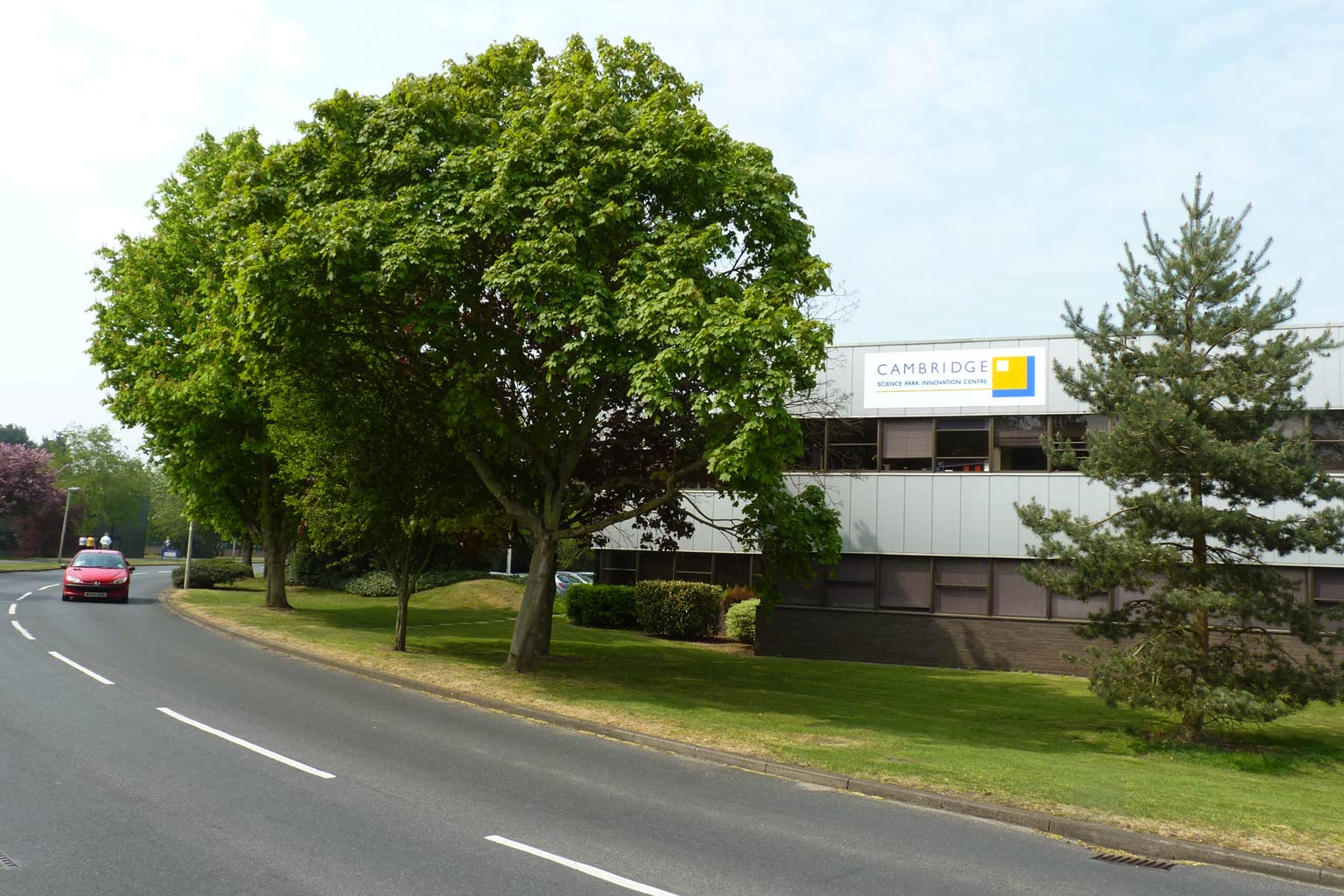
The Innovation Centre

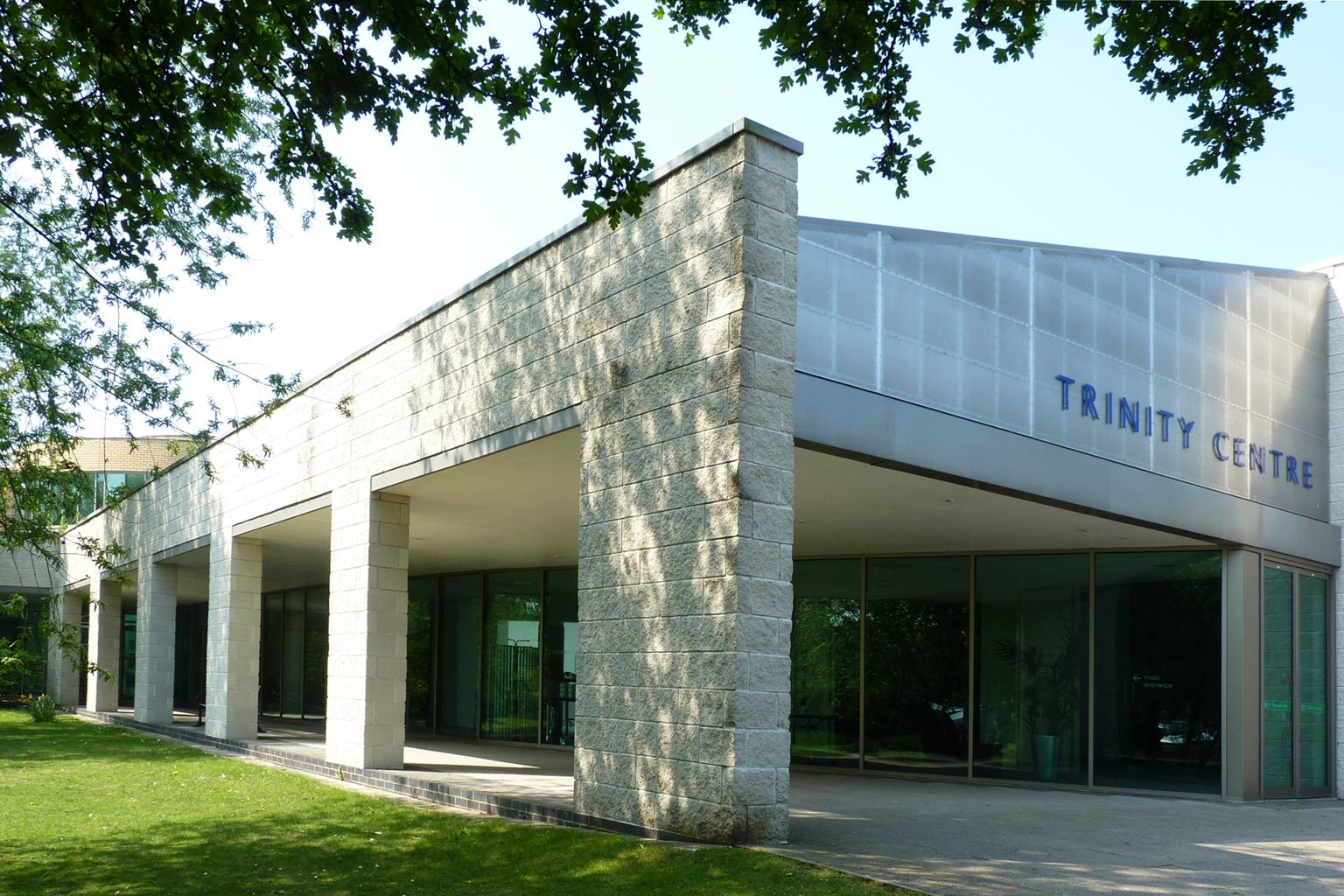
The Trinity Centre entrance

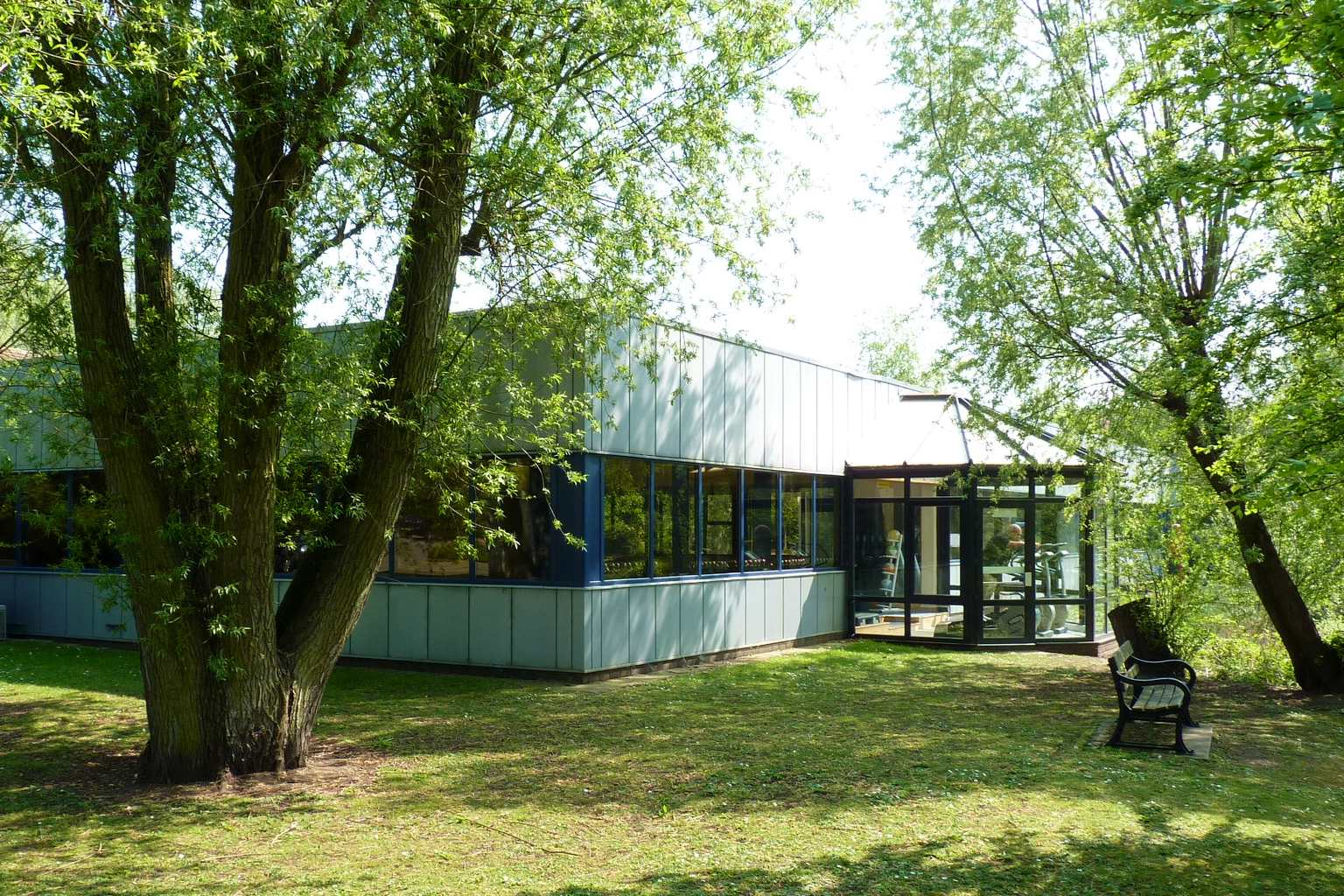
The health and fitness club

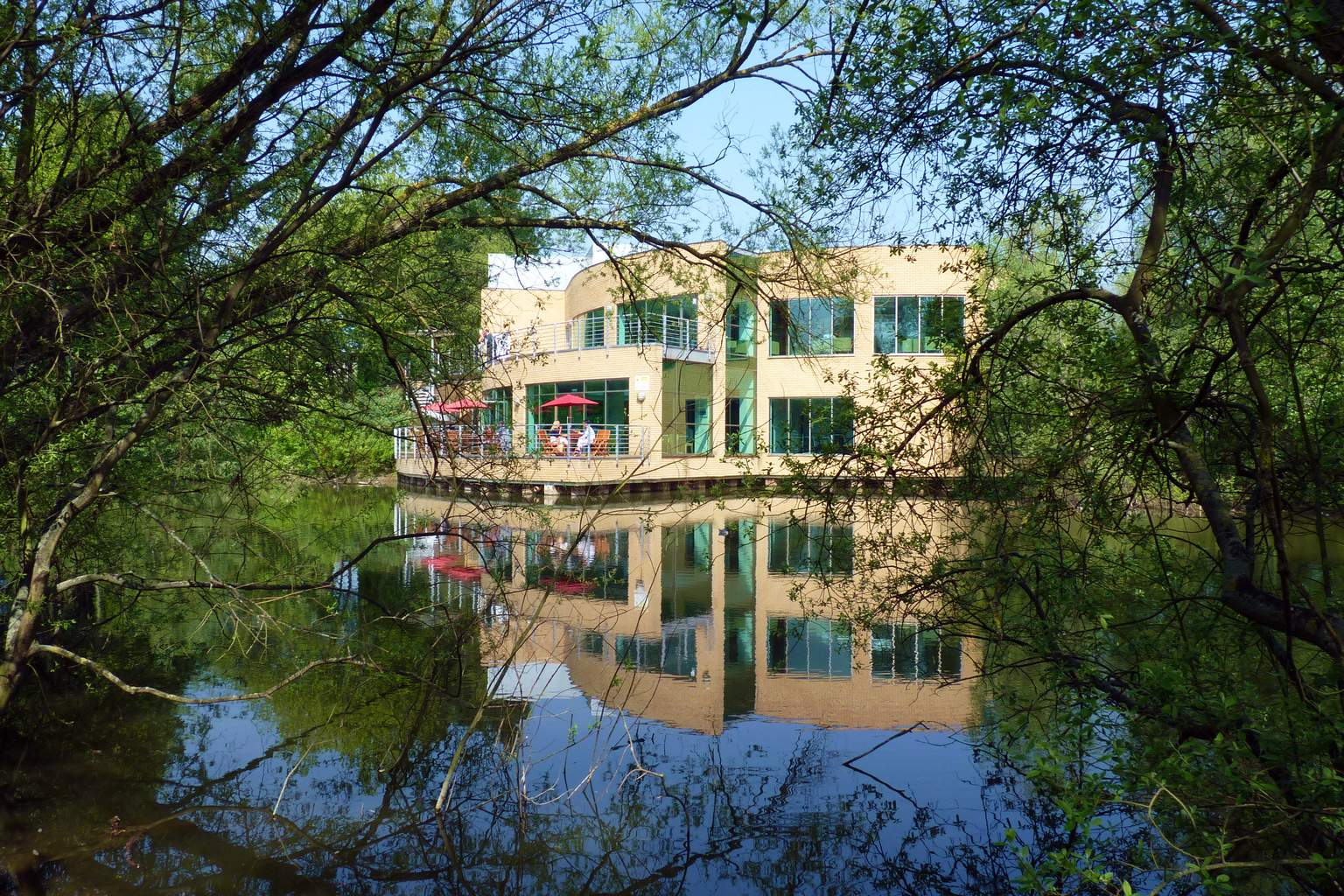
The Trinity Baristas restaurant overlooking the south pond

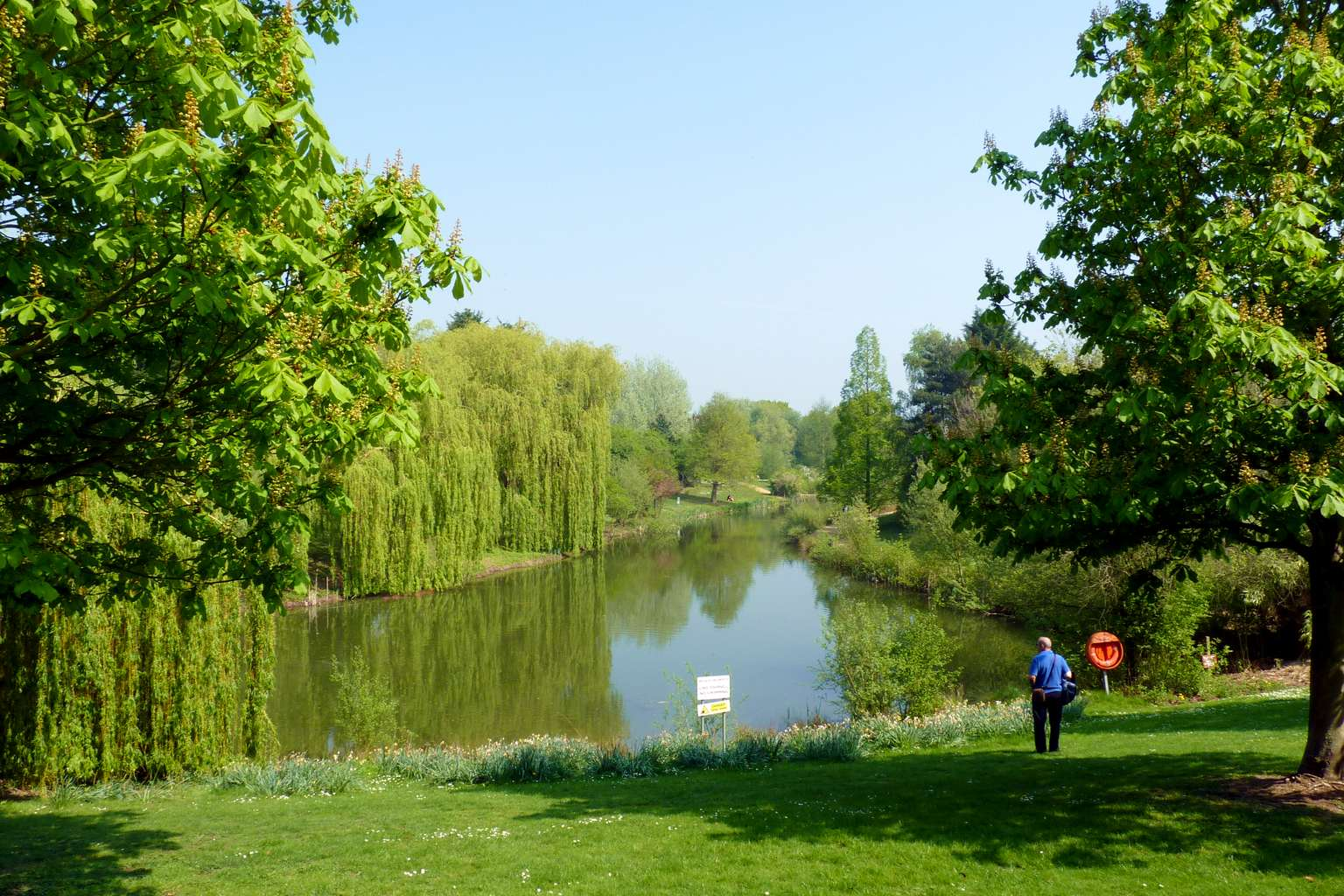
The northeast pond

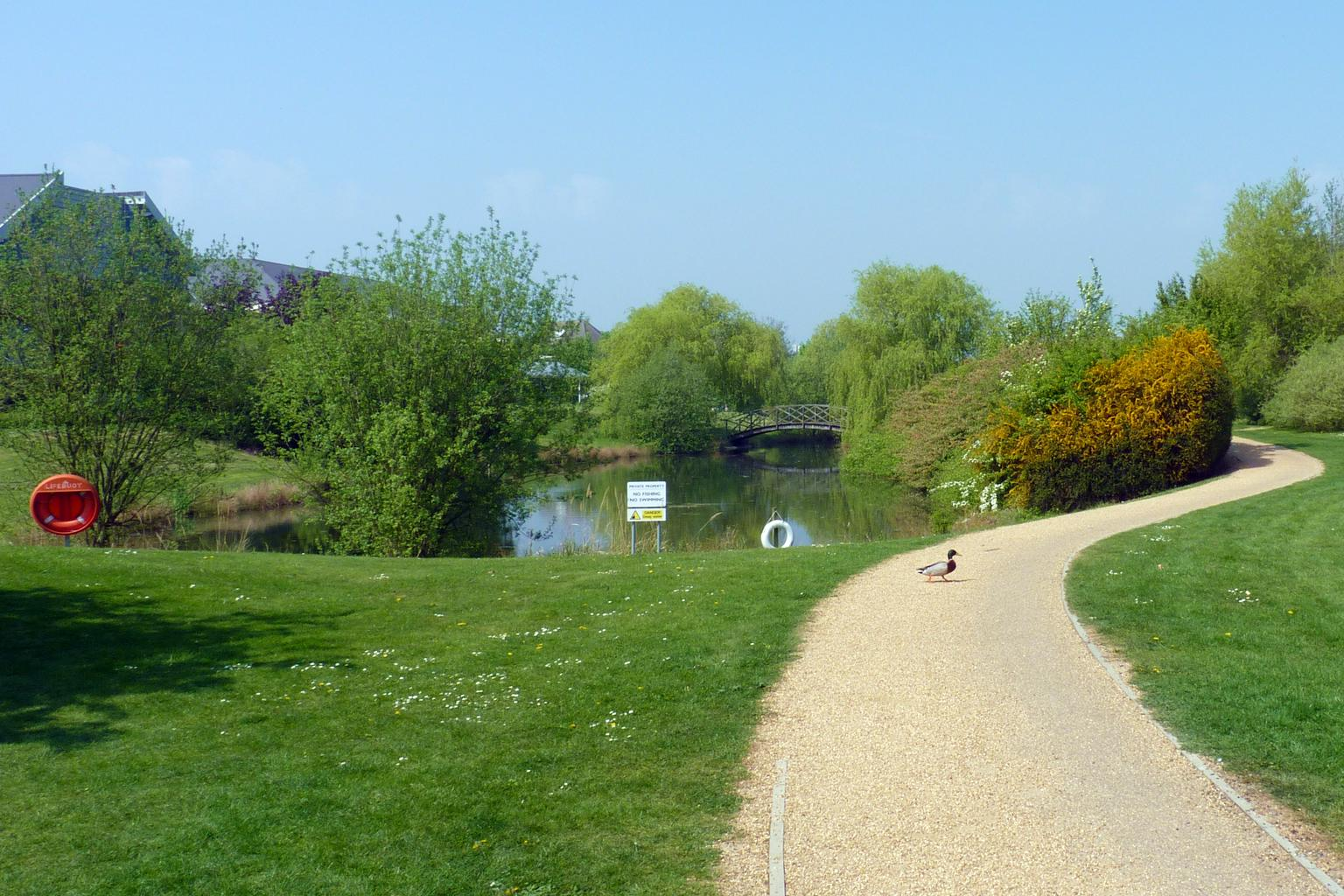
The northwest pond

== See also ==
- List of science parks in the United Kingdom
- Silicon Fen
