= Opioid epidemic in the United States =

Ongoing overuse of opioid medication in the US

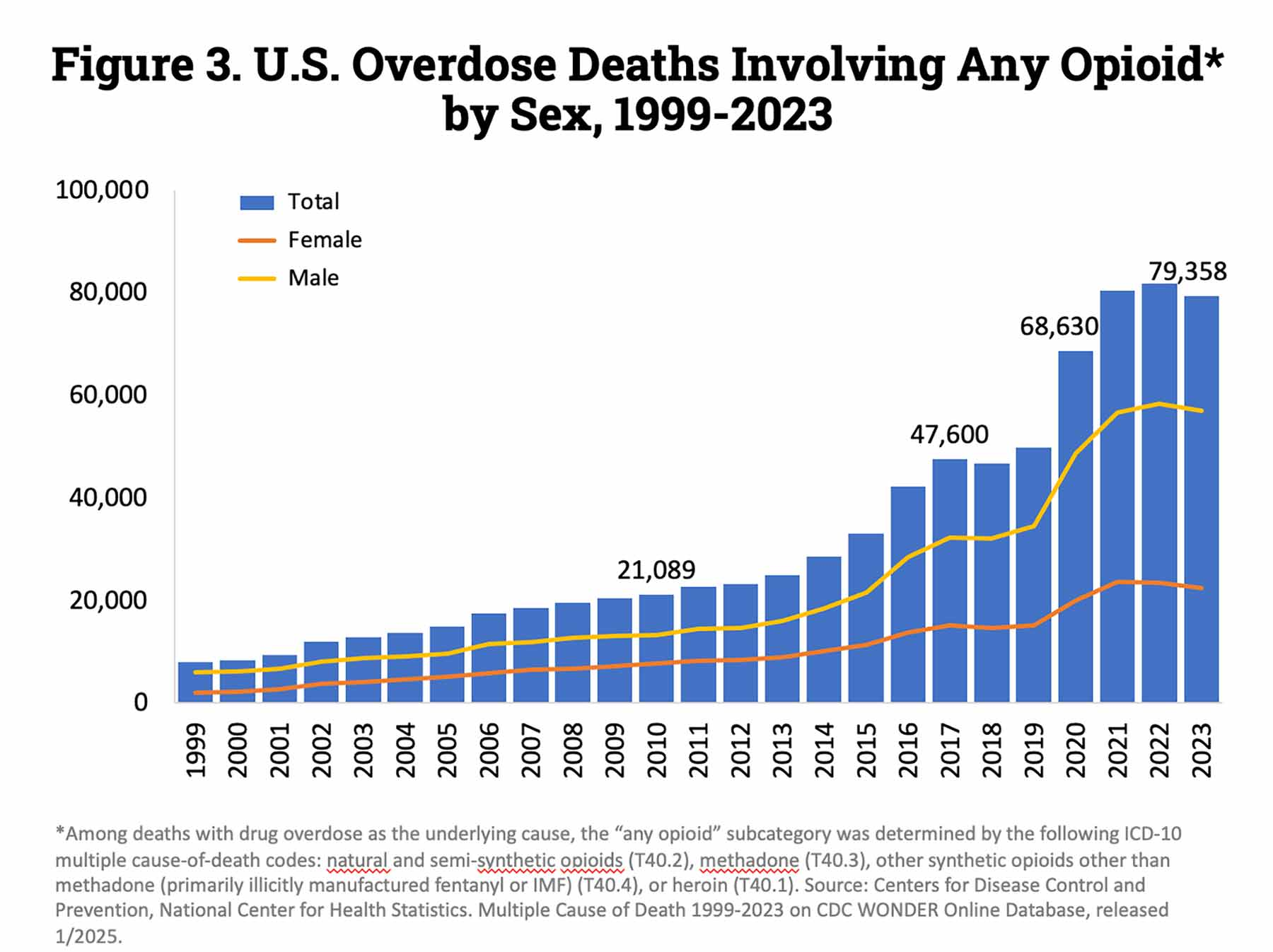
The number of yearly U.S. opioid overdose deaths from all opioid drugs.

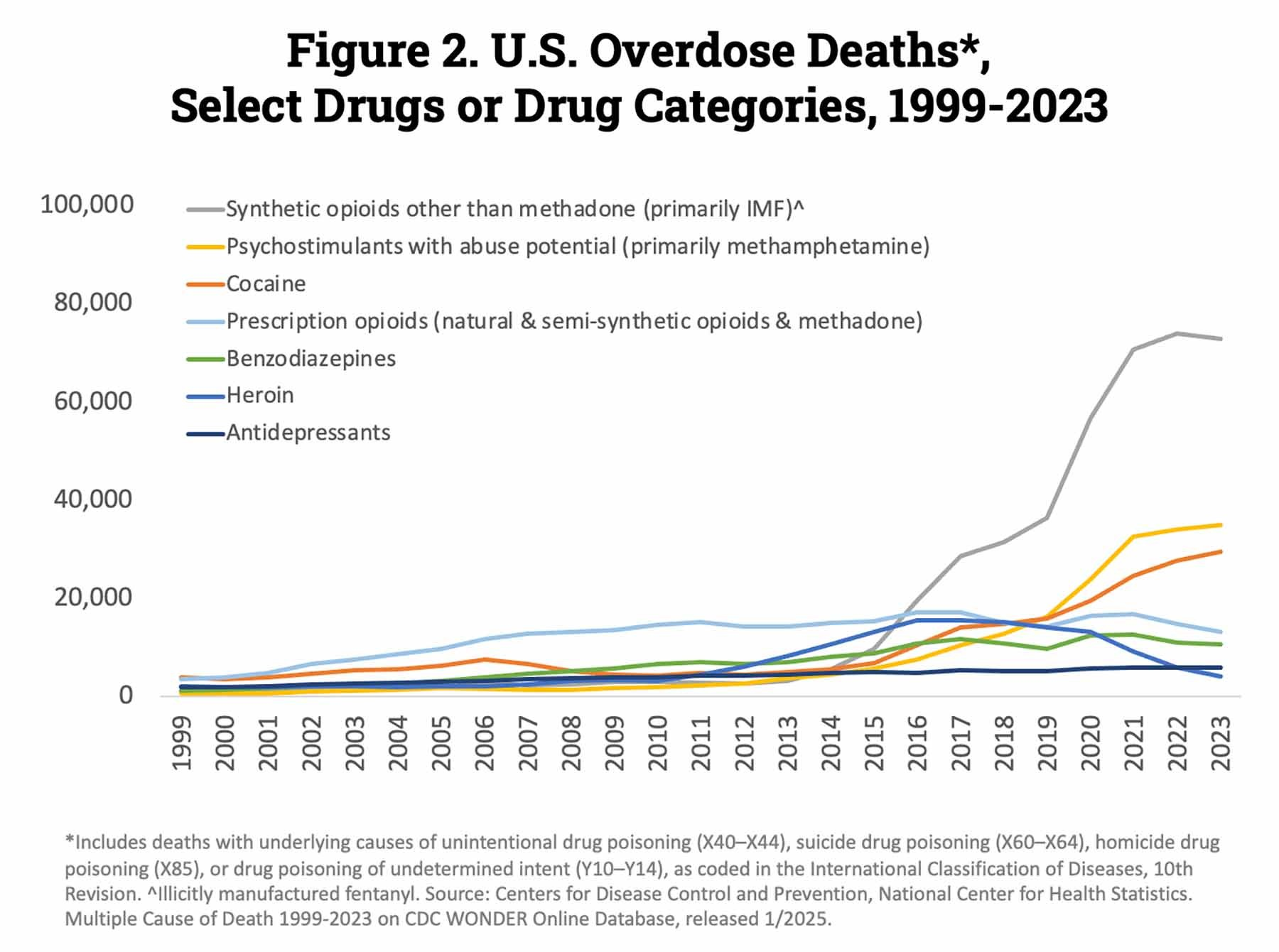
U.S. yearly overdose deaths, and the drugs involved. Among the 108,000 deaths in 2022, the largest share was related to fentanyl and other synthetic opioids (73,838 deaths).

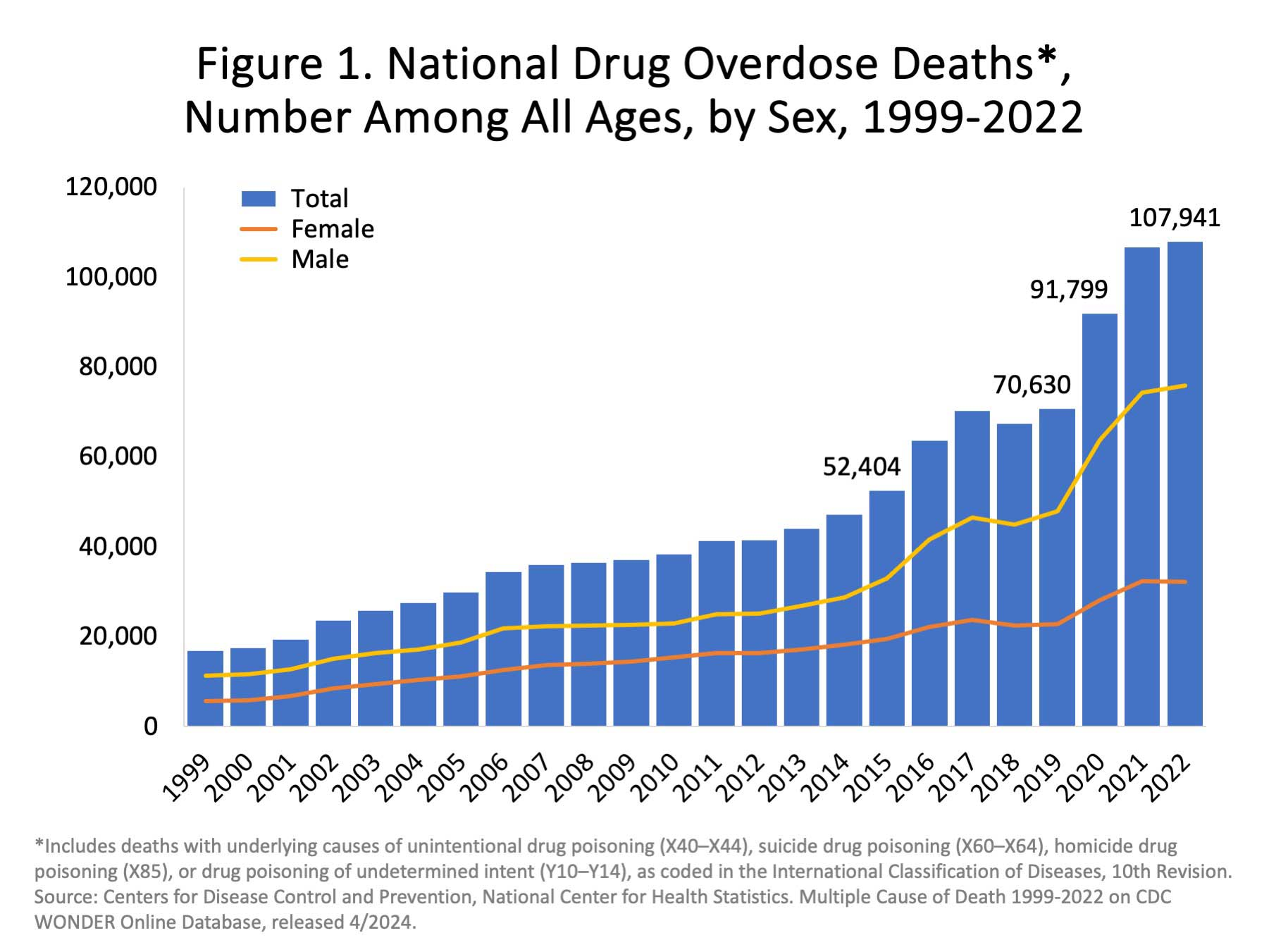
Total drug overdose deaths in the United States.

There is an ongoing opioid epidemic (also known as the opioid crisis) in the United States, originating out of both medical prescriptions and illegal sources. It has been described by doctors and researchers as "one of the most devastating public health catastrophes of our time". The opioid epidemic unfolded in three waves. The first wave of the epidemic in the United States began in the late 1990s, according to the Centers for Disease Control and Prevention (CDC), when opioids were increasingly prescribed for pain management, resulting in a rise in overall opioid use throughout subsequent years. The second wave was from an expansion in the heroin market to supply already addicted people. The third wave, starting in 2013, was marked by a steep tenfold increase in the synthetic opioid-involved death rate as synthetic opioids flooded the US market.

In the United States, there were approximately 109,600 drug-overdose-related deaths in the 12-month period ending January 31, 2023, at a rate of 300 deaths per day. From 1999 to 2020, nearly 841,000 people died from drug overdoses, with prescription and illicit opioids responsible for 500,000 of those deaths. Drug overdose deaths totaled 70,237 in 2017, with 47,600 involving an opioid. This surpassed deaths from car crashes (37,133) by 28%. A December 2017 report estimated that 130 people die every day in the United States due to opioid-related drug overdose. The great majority of Americans surveyed in 2015 who used prescription opioids did not believe that they were misusing them.

The problem is significantly worse in rural areas, where socioeconomic variables, health behaviors, and accessibility to healthcare are responsible for a higher death rate. Teen use of opioids has been noticeably increasing, with prescription drugs used more than any illicit drug except cannabis – more than cocaine, heroin, and methamphetamine combined.

== Background ==
Opioids are a diverse class of strong, addictive, and inexpensive drugs, which include opiates (i.e., morphine and codeine), oxycodone (OxyContin, Percocet), hydrocodone (Vicodin, Norco), and fentanyl. Traditionally, opioids have been prescribed for short-term pain management, as short-term use is supported by a body of evidence. The usefulness of opioids in chronic pain is dependent on the kind of pain being treated (e.g., visceral and central pain may be "especially unresponsive to long-term opioid therapy") and the patient. Clinical guidelines advise that opioids should only be used for chronic pain if safer alternatives are not feasible, as their risks often outweigh their benefits.

The potency and availability of opioids have made them popular as both medical treatments and recreational drugs. The Substance Abuse and Mental Health Services Administration (SAMHSA) estimated that over 10 million Americans abused prescription opioids in 2018; 47,600 Americans died from opioid overdoses in 2018. These substances have high risks of addiction and overdose, and long-term use can cause tolerance and physical dependence. SAMHSA allocated $7.5 billion between January 2016 and June 2020, as response to this opioid crisis. These resources aim to increase access to medications for treatment, reduce overdose deaths, and sustain prevention and recovery. When people continue to use opioid medications beyond what a doctor prescribes, whether to minimize pain or induce euphoric feelings, it can mark the beginning stages of an opioid addiction. More than 650,000 Americans have died of drug overdoses since the opioid epidemic began. The deaths attributable to opioid overdose increased from 16 deaths to 595 deaths per 100,000 population in the US.

== Waves of the opioid epidemic ==
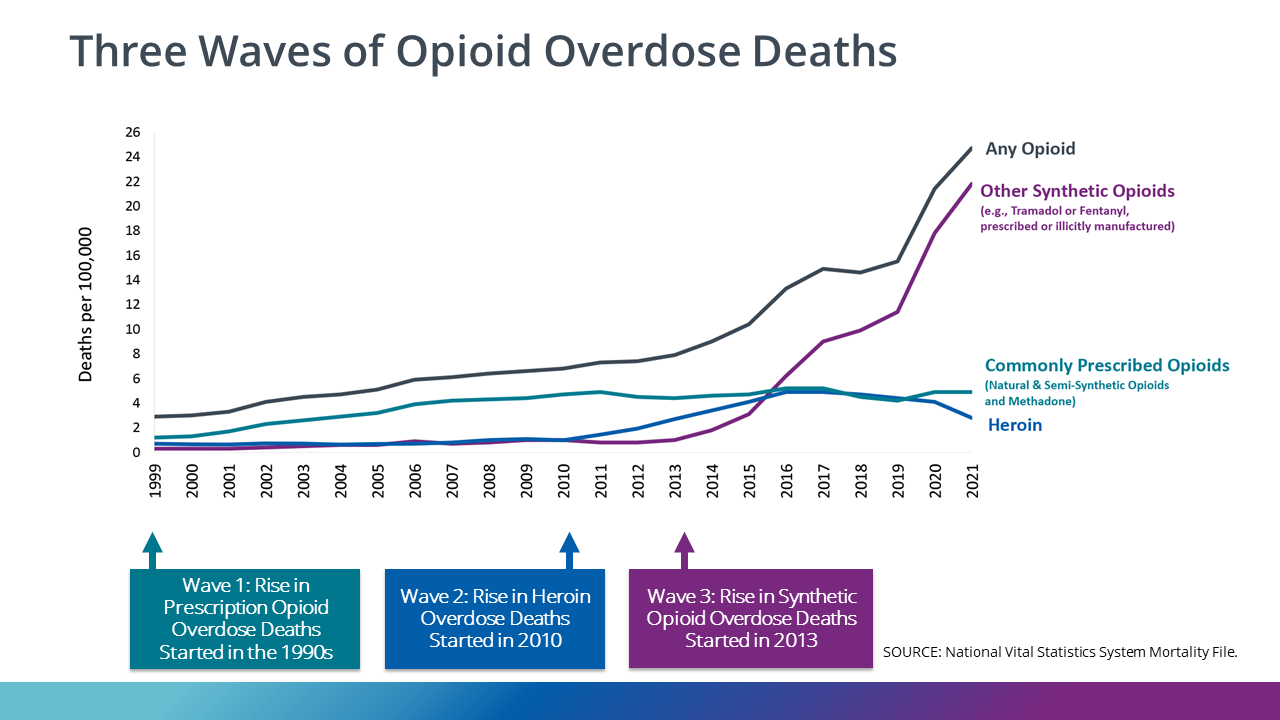
3 waves of opioid overdose deaths, to 2021.

The Centers for Disease Control and Prevention described the U.S. opioid epidemic as having arrived in three waves. 2022 research indicates that since 2016, the United States has been experiencing the fourth wave of the opioid epidemic.

The epidemic began with the overprescription and abuse of prescription drugs. As prescription drugs became less accessible in 2016 in response to CDC opioid prescribing guidelines, there was an increase in demand and accessibility to cheaper, illicit alternatives to opioids, such as heroin and fentanyl.

=== First wave (1990–2010) ===
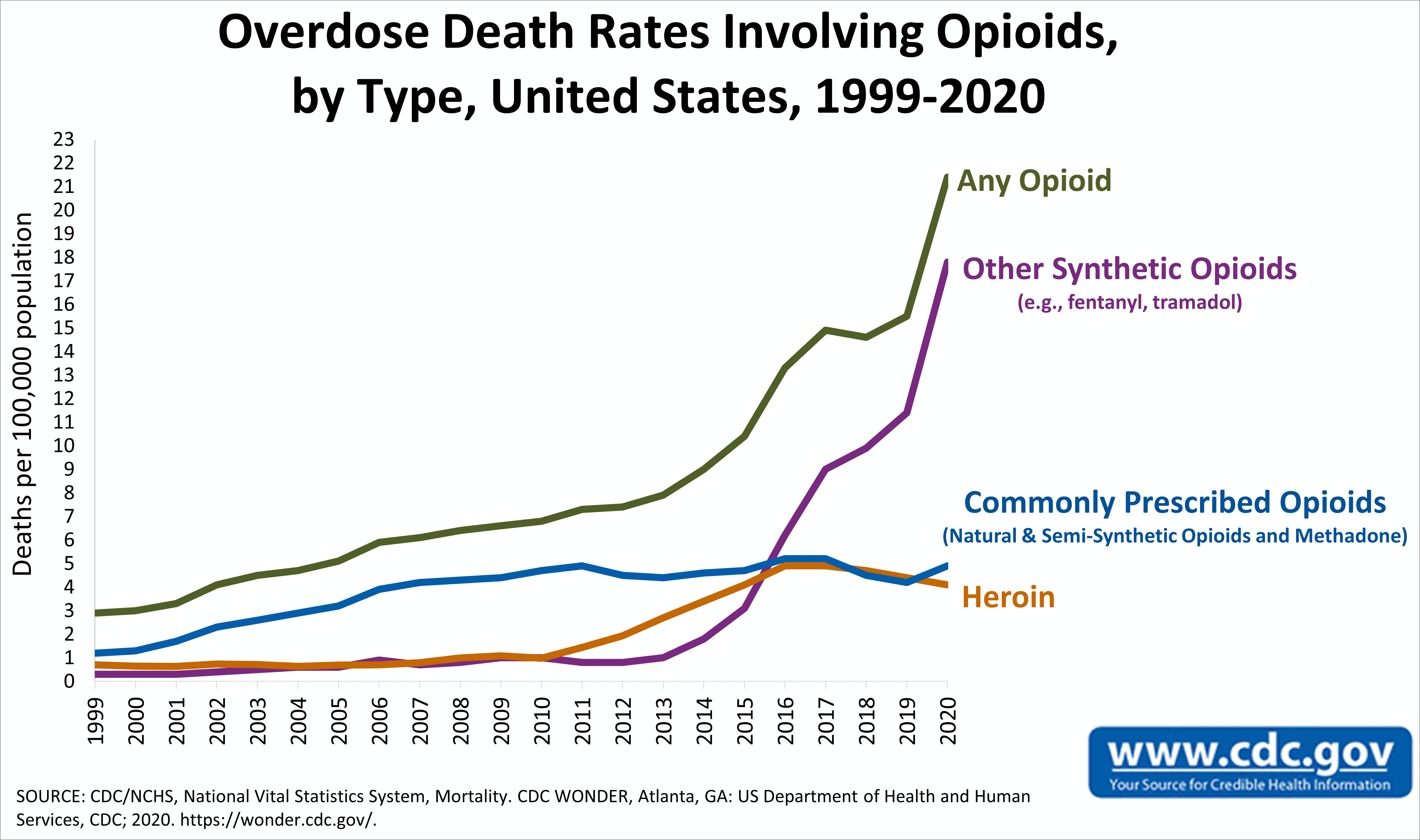
Overdose death rates involving opioids, by type, 1999 to 2020

The first wave, which marked the start of the epidemic, began in the 1990s due to the push towards using opioid medications for chronic pain management and the increased promotion by pharmaceutical companies for medical professionals to use their opioid medications. During this time, around 100 million people in the United States were estimated to be affected by chronic pain. Opioids were only reserved for acute pain experienced secondary to cancer or terminal illnesses.

Physicians avoided prescribing opioids for other medical conditions because of the lack of evidence supporting their use, the concern of opioids having addictive properties, and the fear of being investigated or disciplined for liberal opioid practices. A letter to the editor featured in a January 1980 issue of The New England Journal of Medicine (NEJM) was frequently cited to justify more liberal use of opioids in pain management, which the World Health Organization eventually supported.

In addition, medical organizations began to push for more attentive physician responses to pain, referring to pain as the "fifth vital sign". This was coupled with the promotion of opioids by pharmaceutical companies which insisted that patients could not become addicted. Opioids became an acceptable treatment for a wide variety of conditions, leading to a consistent increase in opioid prescriptions. From 1990 to 1999, the total number of opioid prescriptions grew from 76 million to approximately 116 million, making them the most prescribed class of medications in the United States.

Mirroring the upwards trend in the volume of opioid pain relievers prescribed was an increase in admissions for substance use disorder treatments and opioid-related deaths. This illustrates how legitimate clinical prescriptions of pain relievers were being diverted through an illegitimate market, leading to misuse, addiction, and death. With the increase in volume, the potency of opioids also increased. By 2002, one in six opioid users was prescribed drugs more powerful than morphine. By 2012, the ratio had doubled to one in three. The most commonly prescribed opioids were oxycodone and hydrocodone.

By 2010, Florida became the largest prescriber of oxycodone in the country with very little regulation, having 90 of the nations top 100 opioid prescribers, and 85% of all oxycodone in America was prescribed from Florida. Chris and Jeff George, who were twin brothers from West Palm Beach, are considered the masterminds of the pill mill industry and created the largest pill mill network in the history of the United States selling of $500 million in pills. Florida changed their laws in 2011 and passed the "Pill Mill Bill" after the George brothers indictment, and created a statewide patient database and multiple laws to end the pill mills.

=== Second wave (2010–2013) ===
The second wave of the opioid epidemic began around 2010 and is characterized by the surge in heroin use and overdose deaths. Between 2005 and 2012, the number of people who used heroin nearly doubled, growing from 380,000 to 670,000 individuals. In 2010, there were 2,789 fatal heroin overdoses, representing an almost 50% increase compared to previous years.

This sharp increase can be attributed to the availability of heroin in the United States and its decreasing prices, which enticed a significant portion of individuals already dependent on opioids to switch to a more potent and cost-effective alternative. During this same period, there was a reformulation of OxyContin that made it more difficult to crush and misuse, although the precise impact of this reformulation on the rise in heroin use remains uncertain.

=== Third wave (2013–2016) ===
According to the CDC, the third wave of the opioid epidemic began in 2013, and concluded in 2016. This wave coincided with a significant increase in overdose deaths involving synthetic opioids, particularly illegally produced fentanyl. During this period, deaths related to prescription opioids increased marginally, while heroin-related deaths remained relatively stable. The demographic affected during this wave was younger, less frequently male, and more likely to be white and rural compared to the previous waves.

The third wave also witnessed an increase in opioid-related overdoses among Black and Hispanic individuals in urban areas who use drugs. The rise in fentanyl-related deaths is attributed to the fact that fentanyl is 50 to 100 times more potent than morphine, and it is often mixed into heroin or cocaine to increase potency at a low cost. Considering that Black Americans tend to consume cocaine more frequently than heroin or other prescription opioids compared to white populations, the increase in deaths is linked to the greater prevalence of fentanyl-laced cocaine.

=== Fourth wave (2016–present) ===
The fourth wave, which began in 2016, is characterized by polysubstance use and increased use of stimulants like methamphetamines and cocaine. Additionally, this wave is characterized by the emergence of novel adulterants, such as xylazine and more recently medetomidine in the fentanyl supply. The availability and use of illicit fentanyl continue to be the leading cause of fatalities, but the recent rise of polysubstance use, defined as the practice of using multiple drugs at once or in succession, and stimulants, is linked to the increased fatality rate with the ongoing opioid epidemic.

Between 2012 and 2018, there was a threefold increase in mortality related to cocaine use, and a fivefold increase in mortality related to psychostimulants like methamphetamine. This increase has primarily been observed in male populations from non-Hispanic American Indian, non-Hispanic Black, and non-Hispanic White populations. Researchers attribute the increase in illicit drug use to the CDC's recommendations to reduce opioid use through measures like tapering opioid prescribing.

In 2023, opioid deaths began a sustained decline after peaking at 73,000 that year. Deaths declined by over 1/3 in 2024. The decline is attributed to the reduced availability of fentanyl precursors from China, as the quality of fentanyl decline along supply chains affecting production in both Mexico and China.

== Causes ==
In 2019, the epidemic was described by Rolling Stone as a "uniquely American problem". In 2017, prescription rates for opioids in the United States were 40 percent higher than the rate in other developed countries such as Germany or Canada. yet the FDA did not fully utilize its regulatory mechanisms to restrict the pharmaceutical industry.

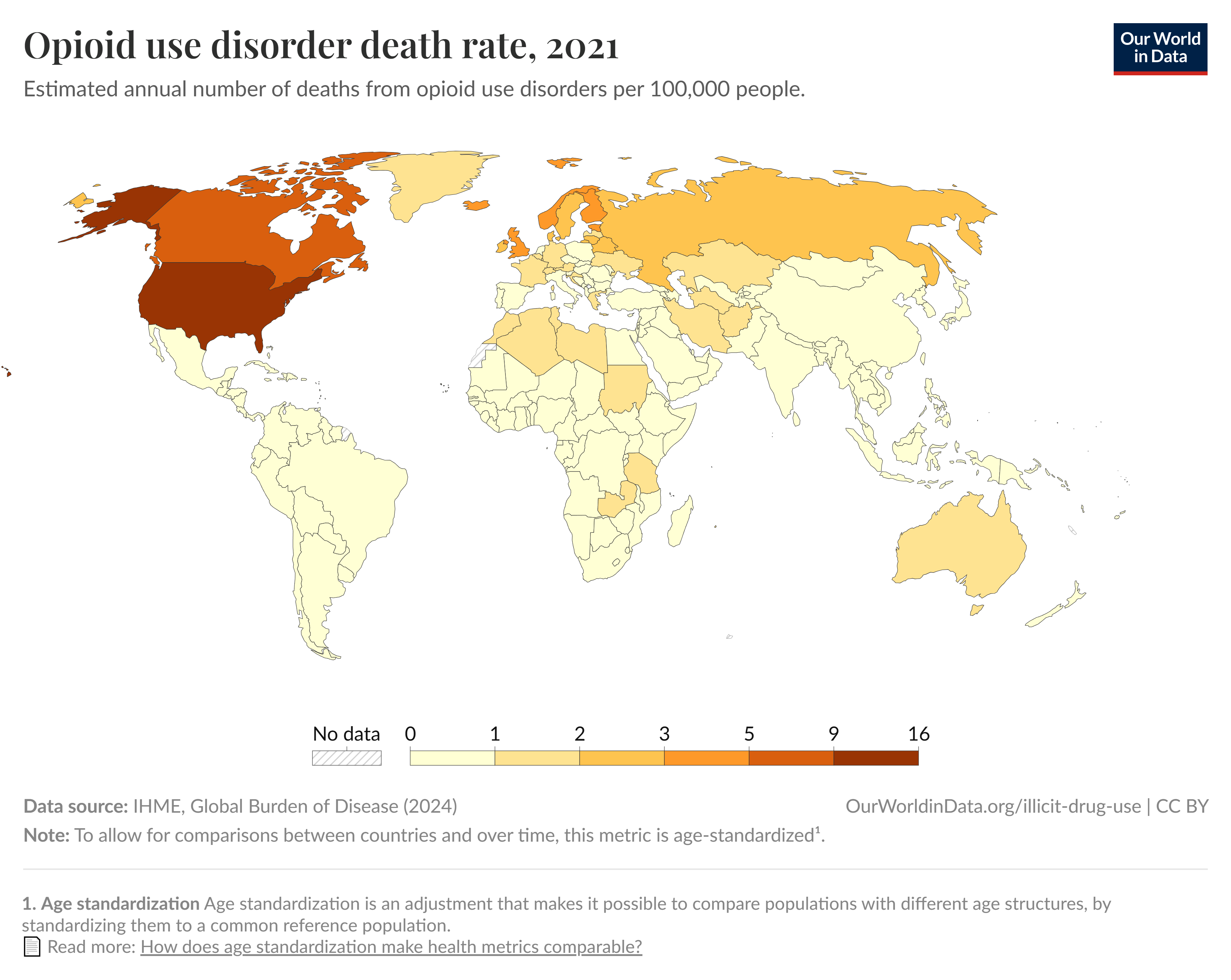
A world map showing each country's 'opioid use disorder' death rate in 2021, by how darkly the country is colored.

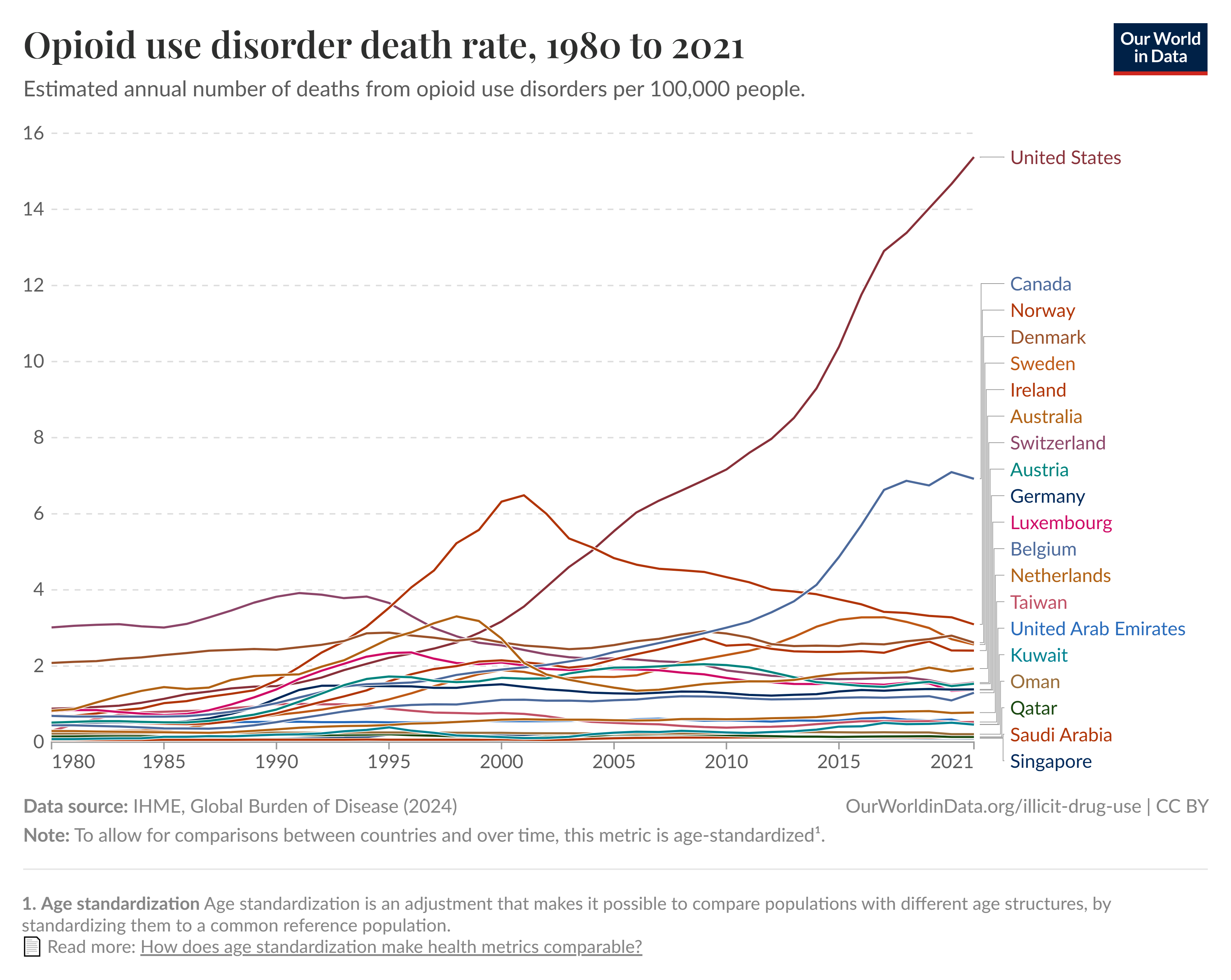
Opioid Use Disorder Death Rate, 1980-2021, of the 20 Countries with the Highest GDP per Capita.

The structure of the U.S. healthcare system, in which people not qualifying for government programs are required to obtain private insurance, favors prescribing drugs over more expensive therapies. According to Professor Judith Feinberg, "Most insurance, especially for poor people, won't pay for anything but a pill."

While the rates of opioid prescriptions increased between 2001 and 2010, the prescription of non-opioid pain relievers (aspirin, ibuprofen, etc.) decreased from 38% to 29% of ambulatory visits in the same period.

The annual opioid prescribing rates have been slowly decreasing since 2012, but the number is still high. There were about 58 opioid prescriptions per 100 Americans in 2017. Characteristics of jurisdictions with a greater number of opioid prescriptions per resident include small cities or large towns, cities with more dentists and primary care doctors per capita, cities with a higher percentage of white residents, cities with a higher uninsured/unemployment rate, and cities with more residents who have diabetes, arthritis, or a disability.

Studies have been conducted to find out how opioids were primarily acquired. A 2013 national survey indicated that 74% of people who recreationally use opioids acquired their opioids directly from a single doctor, friend, or relative, who received their opioids from a clinician. Among pharmacies, the most prolific distributor was Walgreens, which bought 13 billion oxycodone and hydrocodone pills from 2006 to 2012, about twenty percent of all such pills in US pharmacies.

Though aggressive opioid prescription practices played the biggest role in creating the epidemic, the popularity of illegal substances such as potent heroin and illicit fentanyl has become an increasingly large factor. It has been suggested that the decreased supply of prescription opioids, caused by opioid prescribing reforms, has directed addicts to illegal substances.

In 2015, approximately 50% of drug overdoses were not the result of an opioid product from a prescription, though most recreational users' first exposure had been via a lawful prescription. A 2018 study suggested that 75% of people who use opioids recreationally started their opioid use by taking drugs obtained in a way other than by legitimate prescription.

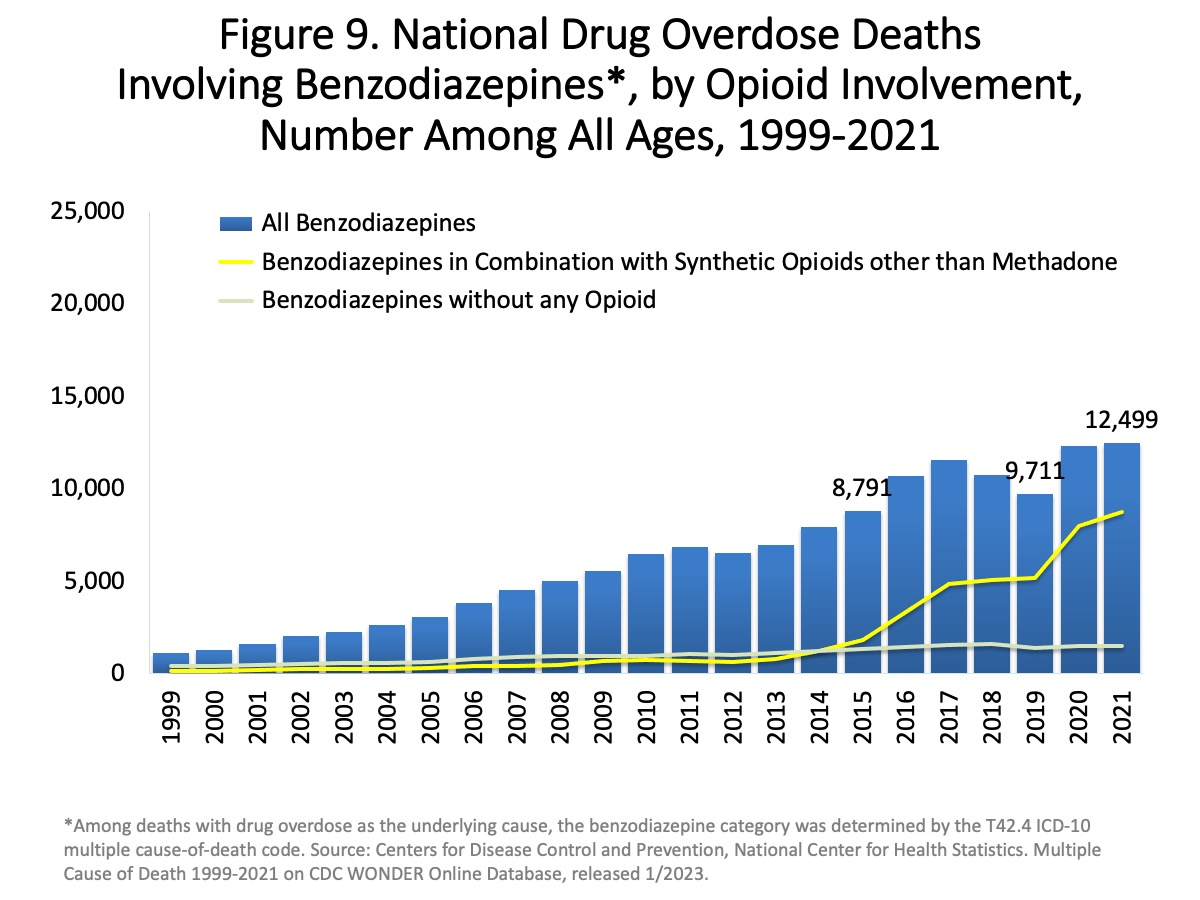
The top line represents the yearly number of benzodiazepine deaths that involved opioids in the United States. The bottom line represents benzodiazepine deaths that did not involve opioids, 1999 to 2021.

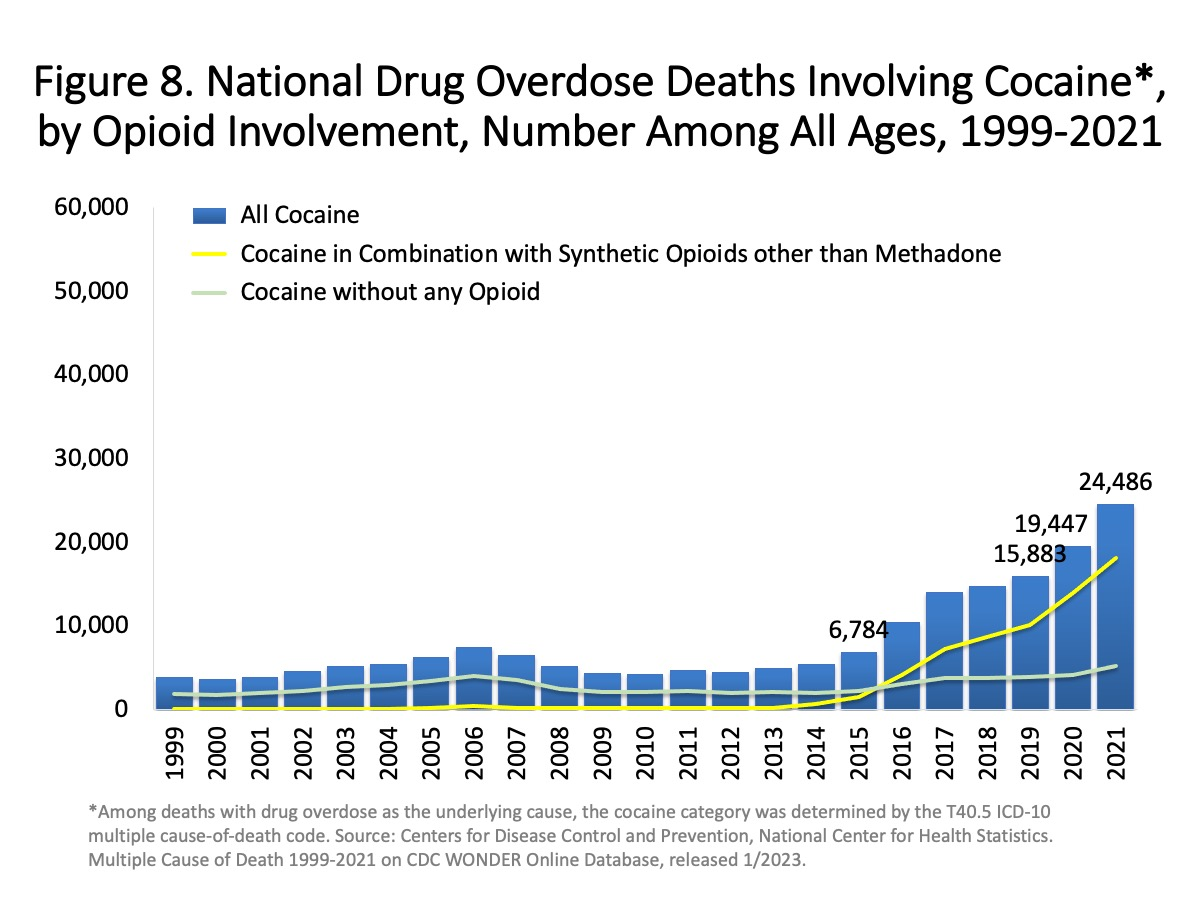
Opioid involvement in cocaine overdose deaths, 1999 to 2021. The yellow line is cocaine and any opioid. Light green line is cocaine without any opioids. Yellow line is cocaine and other synthetic opioids.

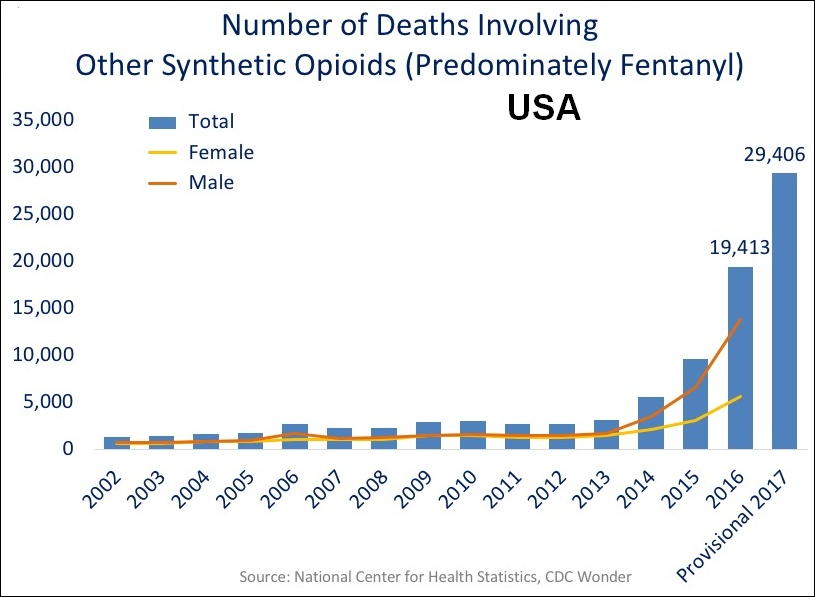
U.S. yearly deaths involving other synthetic opioids, predominately Fentanyl, 2002 to 2017.

== History ==
External audio
- Treating America's Opioid Addiction Part 1: The Narcotic Farm and the Promise of Salvation
- Part 2: Synanon and the Tunnel Back to the Human Race
- Part 3: Searching for Meaning in Kensington, Science History Institute

Opiates such as morphine have been used for pain relief in the United States since the 1800s, and were used during the American Civil War. Opiates soon became known as a "wonder drug" and were prescribed for a wide array of ailments, even for relatively minor treatments such as cough relief. The first published deaths from opioids start being published in The Lancet in 1892 with death reported from Godfrey's Cordial, an opium-containing syrup.

Bayer began marketing heroin commercially in 1898. Beginning around 1920, however, the addictiveness was recognized, and doctors became reluctant to prescribe opiates. Heroin was made an illegal drug with the Anti-Heroin Act of 1924, in which the US Congress banned the sale, importation, or manufacture of heroin.

In the 1950s, heroin addiction was still fairly uncommon among average Americans, many of whom saw it as a frightening condition. The fear extended into the 1960s and 1970s, although it became common to hear or read about drugs such as cannabis and psychedelics, which were widely used at rock concerts like Woodstock.

Heroin addiction began to make the news around 1970 when rock star Janis Joplin died from an overdose. During and after the Vietnam War, addicted soldiers returned from Vietnam, where heroin was easily bought. Heroin addiction grew within low-income housing projects during the same time period. In 1971, congressmen released an explosive report, The World Heroin Problem, on the growing heroin epidemic among US servicemen in Vietnam, finding that ten to fifteen percent were addicted to heroin. "The Nixon White House panicked," wrote political editor Christopher Caldwell, and declared drug abuse "public enemy number one". By 1973, there were 1.5 overdose deaths per 100,000 people.

There were fewer than 3,000 overdose deaths in 1979, when a heroin epidemic was raging in U.S. cities. There were fewer than 5,000 recorded in 1988, around the height of the crack epidemic. More than 64,000 Americans died from drug overdoses in 2016, according to the U.S. Centers for Disease Control and Prevention.

Modern prescription opiates such as Vicodin and Percocet entered the market in the 1970s, but acceptance took several years and doctors were apprehensive about prescribing them. Until the 1980s, physicians had been taught to avoid prescribing opioids because of their addictive nature. A brief letter published in the New England Journal of Medicine (NEJM) in January 1980, titled "Addiction Rare in Patients Treated with Narcotics", was frequently cited to downplay such concerns. The NEJM reexamined the 1980 letter in June 2017, pointing out among other things that the conclusions were based on hospitalized patients only, and not on patients taking the drugs after they were sent home. The letter's original author, Hershel Jick, has said that he never intended for it to justify widespread opioid use.

In the mid-to-late 1980s, the crack epidemic followed widespread cocaine use in American cities. The death rate was worse, reaching almost 2 per 100,000. In 1982, Vice President George H. W. Bush and his aides began pushing for the involvement of the CIA and the US military in drug interdiction efforts, the so-called war on drugs. The initial promotion and marketing of OxyContin was an organized effort throughout 1996–2001, to dismiss the risk of opioid addiction.

8-hour 2015 deposition of Richard Sackler about his family's role in the opioid crisis in the United States

Purdue Pharma hosted over forty promotional conferences at three select locations in the southwest and southeast of the United States. Coupling a convincing "Partners Against Pain" campaign with an incentivized bonus system, Purdue trained its salesforce to convey the message that the risk of addiction was under one percent, ultimately influencing the prescribing habits of the medical professionals that attended these conferences. Consulting firm McKinsey & Company reached a nearly $600 million settlement with 49 of 50 U.S. states in 2021 over the firm's role in driving opioid sales for Purdue Pharma and other pharmaceutical companies. In 2016, the opioid epidemic was killing on average 10.3 people per 100,000, with the highest rates including over 30 per 100,000 in New Hampshire and over 40 per 100,000 in West Virginia. Purdue heavily promoted oxycodone, increasing their earning to US$35 billion by 2017. The owners, the Sackler family, were nevertheless able to file for bankruptcy afterwards.

According to the Substance Abuse and Mental Health Services Administration's National Survey on Drug Use and Health, in 2016 more than 11 million Americans misused prescription opioids, nearly 1 million used heroin, and 2.1 million had an addiction to prescription opioids or heroin.

While rates of overdose of legal prescription opiates have leveled off in the past decade, overdoses of illicit opiates have surged since 2010, nearly tripling.

In a 2015 report, the US Drug Enforcement Administration stated that "overdose deaths, particularly from prescription drugs and heroin, have reached epidemic levels." Nearly half of all opioid overdose deaths in 2016 involved prescription opioids. From 1999 to 2008, overdose death rates, sales, and substance use disorder treatment admissions related to opioid pain relievers all increased substantially. By 2015, there were more than 50,000 annual deaths from drug overdose, causing more deaths than either car accidents or guns.

In 2016, around 64,000 Americans died from overdoses, 21 percent more than the approximately 53,000 in 2015. By comparison, the figure was 16,000 in 2010, and 4,000 in 1999. While death rates varied by state, in 2017 public health experts estimated that nationwide over 500,000 people could die from the epidemic over the next 10 years. In Canada, half of the overdoses were accidental, while a third were intentional. The remainder were unknown. Many of the deaths are from an extremely potent opioid, fentanyl, which is trafficked from Mexico. The epidemic cost the United States an estimated $504 billion in 2015.

In 2017, around 70,200 Americans died from drug overdose. 28,466 deaths were associated with synthetic opioids such as fentanyl and fentanyl analogs, 15,482 were associated with heroin use, 17,029 with prescription opioids (including methadone), 13,942 with cocaine use, and 10,333 with psychostimulants (including methamphetamine).

In 2021, there was an increase in overdose deaths; more than 106,000 drug-related overdoses occurred, including deaths caused by both illegal and prescribed opioids. Of this, 70,601 deaths were caused by synthetic opioids primarily fentanyl. Additionally, 32,537 overdose deaths involved stimulants like cocaine or psychostimulants with abuse potential (primarily methamphetamine).

Between 2017 and 2019, rappers Lil Peep, Mac Miller, and Juice Wrld died of drug overdoses related to opioids. William D. Bodner of the Drug Enforcement Administration's Los Angeles field division and special agent in charge of the investigation into Miller's death said in a statement, "The tragic death of Mac Miller is a high-profile example of the tragedy that is occurring on the streets of America every day."

In 2023, the Biden administration announced a crackdown on Mexican drug cartels smuggling fentanyl into the United States. The Biden administration also targeted Chinese companies importing chemicals used to make fentanyl. Rahul Gupta led White House efforts to combat the opioid epidemic.

=== Heroin ===
Between 4 and 6% of people who misuse prescription opioids turn to heroin, and 80% of heroin addicts began abusing prescription opioids. Many people addicted to opioids switch from taking prescription opioids to heroin because heroin is less expensive and more easily acquired on the black market.

Women are at a higher risk of overdosing on heroin than men. Overall, opioids are among the biggest killers of every race.

Heroin use has been increasing over the years. An estimated 374,000 Americans used heroin in 2002–2005, and this estimate grew to nearly double where 607,000 of Americans had used heroin in 2009–2011. During the first two waves of the opioid epidemic, heroin use increased among non-Hispanic Whites but decreased among non-White groups; additionally during this time, the vulnerability for overdose shifted to younger age groups. In 2014, it was estimated that more than half a million Americans had an addiction to heroin.

=== Oxycodone ===
Oxycodone is the most widely used recreational opioid in the United States. The US Department of Health and Human Services estimates that about 11 million people in the US consume oxycodone in a non-medical way annually.

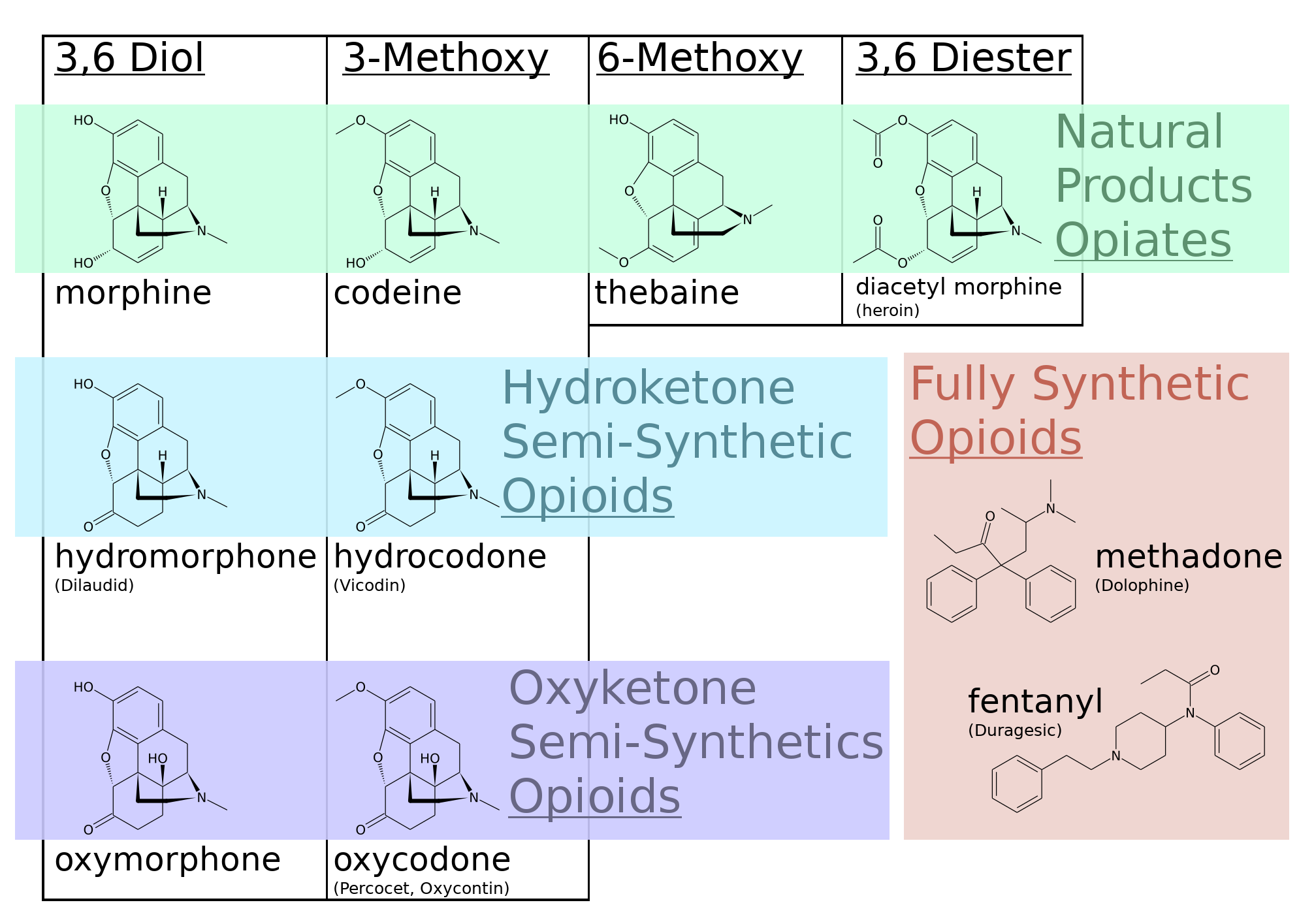
A chart outlining the structural features that define opiates and opioids, including distinctions between semi-synthetic and fully synthetic opiate structures

Oxycodone was first made available in the United States in 1939. In the 1970s, the FDA classified oxycodone as a Schedule II drug, indicating a high potential for non-medical use and addiction. After its 1995 approval by the FDA by Deputy Director Curtis Wright IV, Purdue Pharma introduced OxyContin, a controlled release formulation of oxycodone in 1996. However, drug users quickly learned how to simply crush the controlled release tablet to swallow, inhale, or inject the high-strength opioid for a powerful morphine-like high. In fact, Purdue's private testing conducted in 1995 determined that 68% of the oxycodone could be extracted from an OxyContin tablet when crushed.

In 2007, Purdue paid $600 million in fines after being prosecuted for making false claims about the risk of opioid use disorder associated with oxycodone. In 2010, Purdue Pharma reformulated OxyContin, using a polymer to make the pills extremely difficult to crush or dissolve in water to reduce non-medical use of OxyContin. The FDA approved relabeling the reformulated version as abuse-resistant. OxyContin use following the 2010 reformulation declined slightly while no changes were observed in the use of other opioids.

In June 2017, the FDA asked the manufacturer to remove its long-acting form of oxymorphone (Opana ER) from the US market, because the drug's benefits may no longer outweigh its risks, this being the first time the agency has asked to remove a currently marketed opioid pain medication from sale due to public health consequences of non-medical use.

=== Hydrocodone ===
Hydrocodone is second among the list of top prescribed opioid painkillers, but it is also high on the list of most frequently used for recreational use. In 2011, the non-medical use of hydrocodone was responsible for more than 97,000 visits to the emergency room. In 2012, the Food and Drug Administration (FDA) rescheduled it from a Schedule III drug to a Schedule II drug, recognizing its high potential for non-medical use and addiction.

Hydrocodone can be prescribed under various different brand names. These brand names include Norco, Lortab, and Vicodin. Hydrocodone typically exists in formulations where it is combined with another non-opioid pain reliever such as acetaminophen, or even a cough suppressant.

When opioids like hydrocodone are taken as prescribed, for the indication prescribed, and for a short period of time, then the risk of non-medical use and addiction is small. Problems have surfaced over the last decade however, due to its wide overuse and misuse in the setting of chronic pain.

The elderly are at an increased risk for opioid related overdose because several different classes of medications can interact with opioids and older patients are often taking multiple prescribed medications at a single time. One class of drug that is commonly prescribed in this patient population is benzodiazepines. Benzodiazepines by themselves put older people at risk for falls and fractures due to associated side effects related to dizziness and sedation. Opioids by themselves put older people at risk of respiratory depression and impaired ability to operate vehicles and other machinery. Combining these two drugs together not only increases a person's risk of the aforementioned adverse effects, but can increase a person's risk of overdose and death. Benzodiazepines are also the second leading cause of teen overdose death after fentanyl. They killed 152 people in 2021, less than a fifth of fentanyl's death toll.

Hydrocodone was declared the most widely prescribed opioid between 2007 and 2016, and in 2015 the International Narcotics Control Board reported that greater than 98% of the hydrocodone consumed in the entire world was consumed by Americans.

=== Codeine ===
Codeine is a prescription opiate used to treat mild to moderate pain. It is available as a tablet and cough syrup. A 2013 study on the concoction of codeine with alcohol or soda, also known as "purple drank," reported that codeine is most widely used in a recreational way by men, Native Americans and Hispanics, urban students, and LGBT persons. The study also noted that all people who used "purple drank" reported using alcohol within the past month, and roughly 10 percent of cannabis users reported abusing "purple drank".

=== 2010s to present (increase in fentanyl) ===
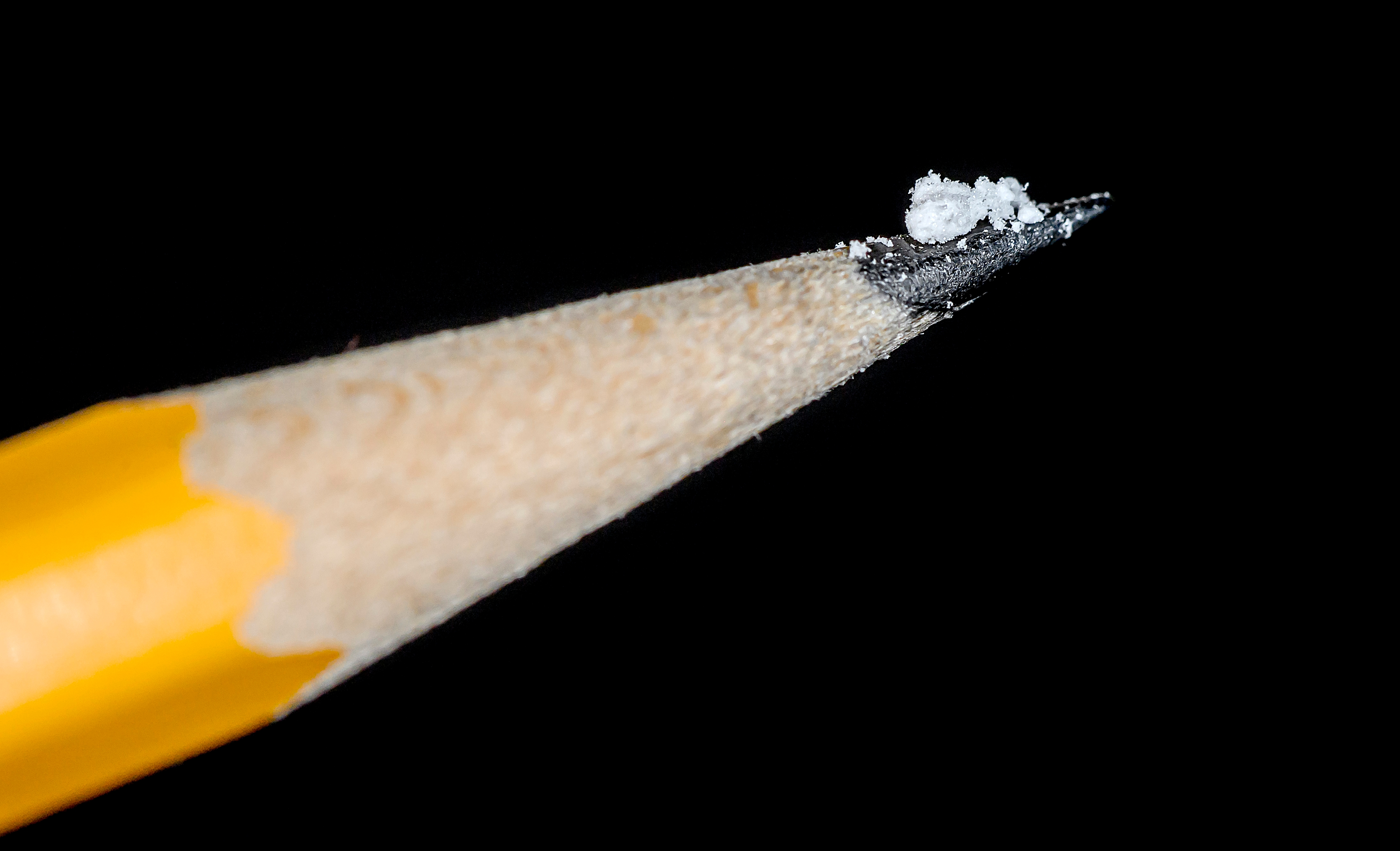
A two milligram dose of fentanyl powder (on pencil tip) is a lethal amount for most people.

As of 2021, the drug epidemic in the United States was the deadliest it had ever been, according to federal data. More than 100,000 people died of drug overdoses in the United States during the 12-month period ending April 2021, according to provisional data published November 17, 2021, by the US Centers for Disease Control and Prevention. Overdose deaths increased 28.5% from the same period a year earlier and nearly doubled over the previous five years. Opioids continued to be the primary cause of drug overdose deaths. Additionally, the drug is increasingly affecting younger populations. A 2018 study found that fentanyl is involved in the majority of opioid-related deaths and that deaths involving fentanyl were more likely to occur in younger age groups and among non-Hispanic white individuals. Furthermore, young adults are increasingly affected by nonfatal fentanyl overdoses in recent time periods along with these other deadly occurrences. The drug is 50 to 100 times stronger than morphine and often cut with other drugs, meaning the user does not know they are taking fentanyl. The Drug Enforcement Administration (DEA) says 2.2 pounds represents half a million lethal doses. Synthetic opioids, primarily fentanyl, caused nearly two-thirds (64%) of all drug overdose deaths in the 12-month period ending April 2021, up 49% from the year before, the CDC's 's National Center for Health Statistics found.

Fentanyl, a synthetic opioid painkiller, is 50 to 100 times more potent than morphine and 30 to 50 times more potent than heroin, with only 2 mg becoming a lethal dose. As of 2023, one dose costs $8 for users in San Francisco. It is pure white, odorless and flavorless. The potency of fentanyl has led to the mistaken belief that exposure to fentanyl by touch can cause an overdose, a myth that has been repeated by media outlets and even government publications. As a result, the Drug Enforcement Administration has recommended that officers not field test drugs if fentanyl is suspected, but instead collect and send samples to a laboratory for analysis. "Exposure via inhalation or skin absorption can be deadly," they state. However, the American College of Medical Toxicity and the American Academy of Clinical Toxicology stated that, as of 2017, they were not aware of "emergency responders developing signs or symptoms consistent with opioid toxicity from incidental contact with opioids.". A 2021 article in the journal Health & Justice reported that "many of the reported fentanyl exposure incidents among police share the symptoms of a panic attack rather an opioid overdose," and a 2020 article from the Journal of Medical Toxicology stated that "the consensus of the scientific community remains that illness from unintentional exposures is extremely unlikely, because opioids are not efficiently absorbed through the skin and are unlikely to be carried in the air."

According to the United States Drug Enforcement Agency in 2023, China continued to be the primary source of fentanyl being imported into the United States, killing over 100 Americans every day. Over a two-year period, close to $800 million worth of fentanyl was illegally sold online to the US by Chinese distributors. The drug is usually manufactured in China, then shipped to Mexico, where it is processed and packaged, which is then smuggled into the US by drug cartels. A large amount is also purchased online and shipped through the US Postal Service. It can also be purchased directly from China, which has become a major manufacturer of various synthetic drugs illegal in the US. AP reporters found multiple sellers in China willing to ship carfentanyl, an elephant tranquilizer that is so potent it has been considered a chemical weapon. The sellers also offered advice on how to evade screening by US authorities. According to Assistant US Attorney Matt Cronin in 2019:

It is a fact that the People's Republic of China is the source for the vast majority of synthetic opioids that are flooding the streets of the United States and Western democracies. It is a fact that these synthetic opioids are responsible for the overwhelming increase in overdose deaths in the United States. It is a fact that if the People's Republic of China wanted to shut down the synthetic opioids industry, they could do so in a day.

Annual fentanyl seizures in Mexico

According to the United States House Select Committee on Strategic Competition between the United States and the Chinese Communist Party, the Chinese government directly subsidizes producers of fentanyl precursors and analogues through tax rebates and other incentives. Since 2019, the Chinese government has removed online records of subsidies for fentanyl-related producers.

In 2016, federal legislation loosened the de minimis exemption, which permitted parcels under $800 in value to enter the country duty-free with minimal inspection. The change in the de minimis eligibility led to the rapid growth in parcels coming from China, including those containing fentanyl. Deaths from fentanyl in 2016 increased by 540 percent across the United States since 2013. This accounts for almost "all the increase in drug overdose deaths from 2015 to 2016", according to a study published in the Journal of the American Medical Association. Readily available fentanyl killed 70,000 people in 2021 alone.

Fentanyl-laced heroin has become a big problem for major cities, including Philadelphia, Detroit and Chicago. Its use has caused a spike in deaths among users of heroin and prescription painkillers, while becoming easier to obtain and conceal. Some arrested or hospitalized users are surprised to find that what they thought was heroin was actually fentanyl. According to former CDC director Tom Frieden in 2016:

As overdose deaths involving heroin more than quadrupled since 2010, what was a slow stream of illicit fentanyl, a synthetic opioid 50 to 100 times stronger than morphine, is now a flood, with the amount of the powerful drug seized by law enforcement increasing dramatically. America is awash in opioids; urgent action is critical.

According to the Centers for Disease Control and Prevention (CDC), death rates from synthetic opioids, including fentanyl, increased over 72% from 2014 to 2015. In addition, the CDC reports that the total deaths from opioid overdoses may be under-counted, since they do not include deaths that are associated with synthetic opioids which are used as pain relievers. The CDC presumes that a large proportion of the increase in deaths is due to illegally-made fentanyl; as the statistics on overdose deaths (as of 2015) do not distinguish pharmaceutical fentanyl from illegally-made fentanyl, the actual death rate could, therefore, be much higher than reported.

Those taking fentanyl-laced heroin are more likely to overdose because they do not know they also are ingesting the more powerful drug. The most high-profile death involving an accidental overdose of fentanyl was singer Prince.

Fentanyl has surpassed heroin as a killer in several locales: in all of 2014 the CDC identified 998 fatal fentanyl overdoses in Ohio, which is the same number of deaths recorded in just the first five months of 2015. The US Attorney for the Northern District of Ohio stated:

One of the truly terrifying things is the pills are pressed and dyed to look like oxycodone. If you are using oxycodone and take fentanyl not knowing it is fentanyl, that is an overdose waiting to happen. Each of those pills is a potential overdose death.

In 2016, the medical news site STAT reported that while Mexican cartels are the main source of heroin smuggled into the US, Chinese suppliers provide both raw fentanyl and the machinery necessary for its production. In Southern California, a home-operated drug lab with six pill presses was uncovered by federal agents; each machine was capable of producing thousands of pills an hour.

Overdoses involving fentanyl have greatly contributed to the havoc caused by the opioid epidemic. In New Hampshire, two thirds of the fatal drug overdoses involved fentanyl, and most do not know that they are taking fentanyl. In 2017, a cluster of fentanyl overdoses in Florida was found to be caused by street sales of fentanyl pills sold as Xanax. According to the DEA, one kilogram (2.2 lb) of fentanyl can be bought in China for $3,000 to $5,000, and then smuggled into the United States by mail or Mexican drug cartels to generate over $1.5 million in revenue. The profitability of this drug has led dealers to adulterate other drugs with fentanyl without the knowledge of the drug user.

In 2022, the FDA warned, that xylazine, an animal tranquilizer, is increasingly being detected in heroin and illicit fentanyl. A study on rats focusing on the lethal effects of xylazine-fentanyl mixtures compared to fentanyl’s side effects on its own, found that the mixtures disrupted for an extended period of time, the hyperoxic phase that increases oxygen levels in the central nervous system. This is due to xylazine’s role in the mixture as an agonist to Alpha-2 adrenoceptors, found in blood vessels’ smooth muscle cells; the adulterant lessens vascular tone and causes muscular atonia, ensuring decreased chance of recovery following brain oxygen deprivation.

One study found that, although relatively uncommon, "the presence of fentanyl in the stimulant supply increased significantly between 2011 and 2016, with the greatest increases occurring between 2015—2016; the presence of these products was concentrated in the U.S. Northeast."

== Demographics ==
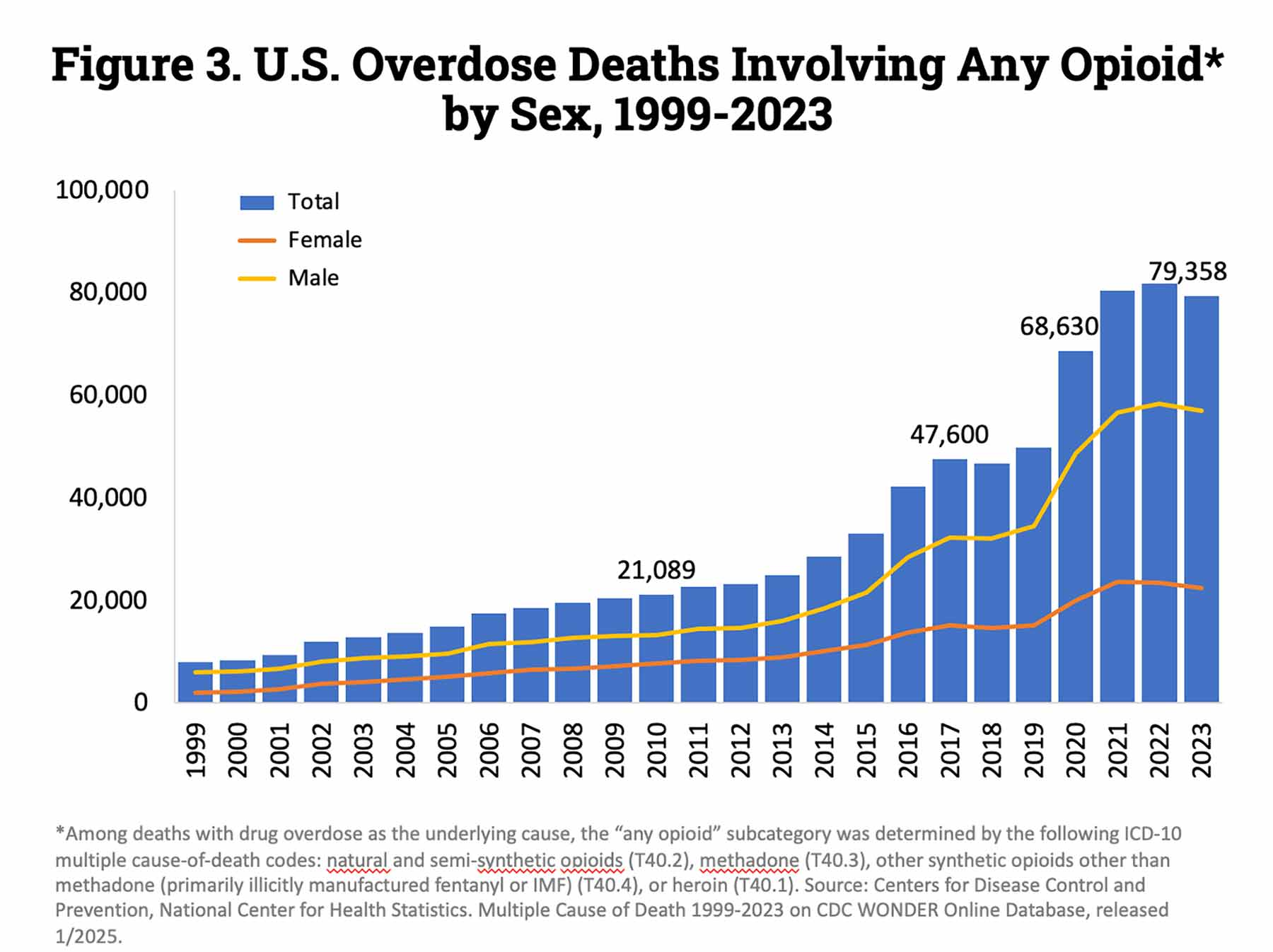
US timeline. Opioid deaths

In 2016, opioid overdoses killed approximately 91 Americans each day. Roughly half of these deaths were caused by prescribed opioids. Given the complexity of the topic and the difficulty of controlling factors while researching, there is much speculation the differences between demographics.

In 2015, Anne Case and Angus Deaton's theory of the deaths of despair identified the root causes of the increase in opioid deaths as high levels of poverty, income inequality, and unemployment due to deteriorating labor markets, a lack of access to social capital, a lack of access to healthcare, and high social isolation. They reported that opioid overdose deaths were disproportionately affecting white, middle-aged, and less-educated Americans, particularly those living in rural areas.

=== Race ===
Black rates as of 2020 surpassed white rates of opioid overdose. From the .csv data download for the 2020 table below: "Persons of Hispanic origin may be of any race, but are categorized as Hispanic; other groups are non-Hispanic."

2020 opioid Overdose Deaths by Race/Ethnicity. KFF State Health Facts
Overall	White	Black	Hispanic	Asian	American Indian or Alaska Native	Native Hawaiian/Pacific Islander	Multiple Races
21.4	25.5	26.6	13.1	2.6	28.1	6	12.2

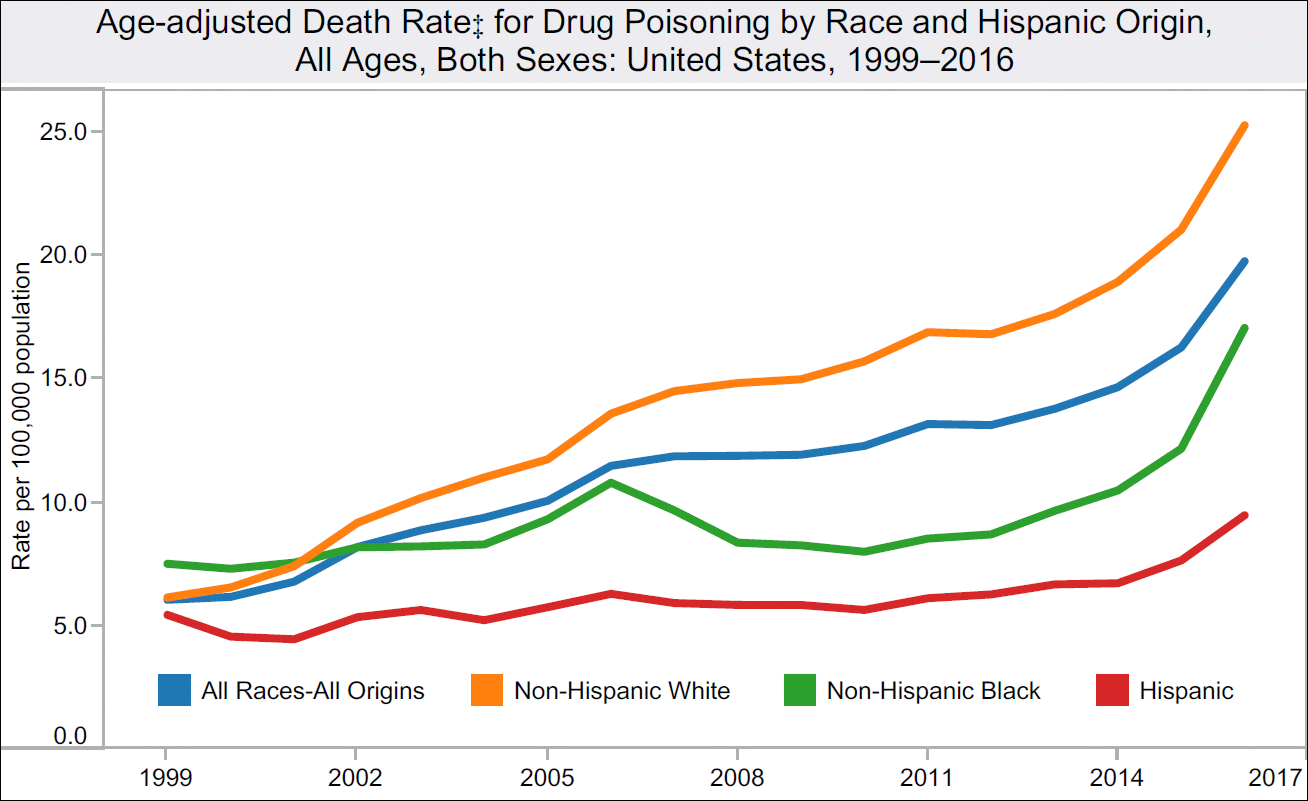
Timeline of US drug overdose death rates by race and ethnicity. Rate per 100,000 population.

In 2023, the most opioid overdose deaths were among White Americans (47,754), followed by African Americans (16,481), Latinos (11,310), Native Americans (1,170), and Asians (695). While media attention has often focused on the uptick of deaths among middle class White Americans, the heroin overdose death rate among African Americans has gone up more than 200 percent since 2010. Among Latinos, it climbed nearly 140 percent.

The prevalence of rural opioid overdose deaths per 100,000 within the USA was highest for Native Americans, followed by non-Hispanic Whites, Black, Hispanic, and Asian/Pacific Islander individuals. During the first and second wave of the opioid epidemic, White American people were most affected by opioid overdose. While all groups were affected in the third and fourth wave of the epidemic, White Americans and non-Hispanic Black individuals saw the greatest rise in deaths.

Native Americans and Alaska Natives experienced a five-fold increase in opioid-overdose deaths between 1999 and 2015, with Native Americans having the highest increase of any demographic group. With the belief that there would be a low risk of addiction, Indian Health Service physicians, like doctors nationwide, readily prescribed opioids. In addition, structural health care deficiencies from the provider and cultural beliefs against receiving care from the patient, as well as inadequate community support structures for substance misuse, contributed to high mortality rates. In 2015, American Indians/Alaska Natives had the greatest drug overdose mortality rates of any U.S. population, comparable to White Americans. In 2018, the opioid crisis continued to disproportionately affect non-Hispanic Whites and Native Americans with the National Institutes of Health (NIH) reporting a rise in opioid morbidity and opioid related fatalities.

During 2019–2020, non-Hispanic American Indian/Alaska Native and Black individuals experienced the greatest increases in drug overdose mortality rates. Additionally, American Indian/Alaska Native and Black individuals had the highest opioid overdose rate 2020 and 2021. The percentage of individuals with documentation of prior treatment for substance use disorders was low, especially among Black individuals, at 8.3%. Overall, Hispanics, Native Hawaiians, and Asians experienced the lowest rate of overdose deaths.

Though previous statistics show that non-Hispanic White Americans have been affected by the opioid epidemic more than other racial/ethnic groups in the United States, recent statistics show that Black Americans are experiencing a sharper increase in opioid-overdose deaths. The annual percentage change of opioid overdose deaths among Black Americans increased to 26.16 from 2012 to 2018 while White Americans only experienced an 18.96 increase from 2013 to 2016 and even had an annual percentage change decrease to 5.07 from 2016 to 2018. The challenges that non-Hispanic Black Americans face have a disparate impact on the rates of opioid-overdose related deaths when compared to non-Hispanic White Americans who have not dealt with the challenges of structural racism. Recent research has linked the rise in opioid-overdose deaths among Black Americans to the lack of safety, security, stability, and survival in their communities. Those missing pieces in these communities can be linked to a host of things including exposure to structural racism, lack of access to resources, and widespread mistrust in the healthcare system.

Structural racism continues to have a lasting impact on predominantly Black communities in the United States. Racial segregation is one of the main forms of structural racism that has been linked to the increase in opioid-overdose related deaths among non-Hispanic Black Americans. Racial segregation does not only impact access to social and economic resources. It also has an impact on public health and disrupts access to health care. The impact that racial segregation has health care spills over to the access of substance use services. This leads to Black Americans having a more difficult time when seeking treatment for opioid use. Structural racism has also led to the consistent misdirection of funds and the over-funding of criminal legal systems within predominantly non-Hispanic Black communities. Instead of funding being used to improve substance abuse treatment and prevention, funds have been used to criminalize drugs and impose harsh penalties on Black community members. The policies put in place years ago have led to stereotyping and fear within Black communities that prevents Black Americans from seeking substance abuse treatment. In America there are continual concerns regarding racial biases against non-Hispanic Black Americans when it comes to drug enforcement. Black Americans have historically been more criminalized for opioid related offenses, and despite calls for change there are still lasting impacts of this today.

Medication-assisted treatments like buprenorphine have been proven to help treat substance use. The facilities that offer this treatment tend to be in communities with predominantly non-Hispanic White populations and they are rarely seen in predominantly non-Hispanic Black communities despite their proven effectiveness. The national focus being on prescription of opioids for pain management is a leading cause for non-Hispanic Black Americans receiving unequal treatment opportunities. Data has shown that this is not the main issue in every city/state, which shows the need for a more local data driven approach to opioid abuse intervention.

=== Sex ===
This is especially concerning considering the epidemiology of opioid affliction among white women, who are at a greater risk because they receive more prescription medications than men. According to the NIH (2018), "The opioid epidemic is increasingly young, white, and female" with 1.2 million women being diagnosed with an opioid use disorder compared to 0.9 million men in 2015.

=== Age ===
In 2014, roughly 12 percent of young adults between the ages of 18 and 25 reported abusing prescribed opioids. Non-medical prescription drug use rates have been increasing in teenagers with access to parents' medicine cabinets, especially as 12- to 17-year-old girls were one-third of all new users of prescription drugs in 2006. Teens used prescription drugs more than any illicit drug except cannabis, more than cocaine, heroin, and methamphetamine combined. In 2014, roughly 6 percent of teenagers between the ages of 12 and 17 reported abusing prescribed opioids. Deaths from overdose of heroin affect younger people more than deaths from other opiates.

=== Economic status ===
Prescription opioids are considered a better financial choice for treating pain than surgery. This resulted in an increased use of prescription opioids by individuals living in communities that were underserved medically or did not have health insurance. Overdose death rates increased across most racial and ethnic groups due to county-level income inequality, particularly among Black and Hispanic individuals. In 2020, overdose rates were more than twice as high in counties with greater inequality compared to counties with lower inequality.

=== Geography ===
Overdose death rates in the United States by County

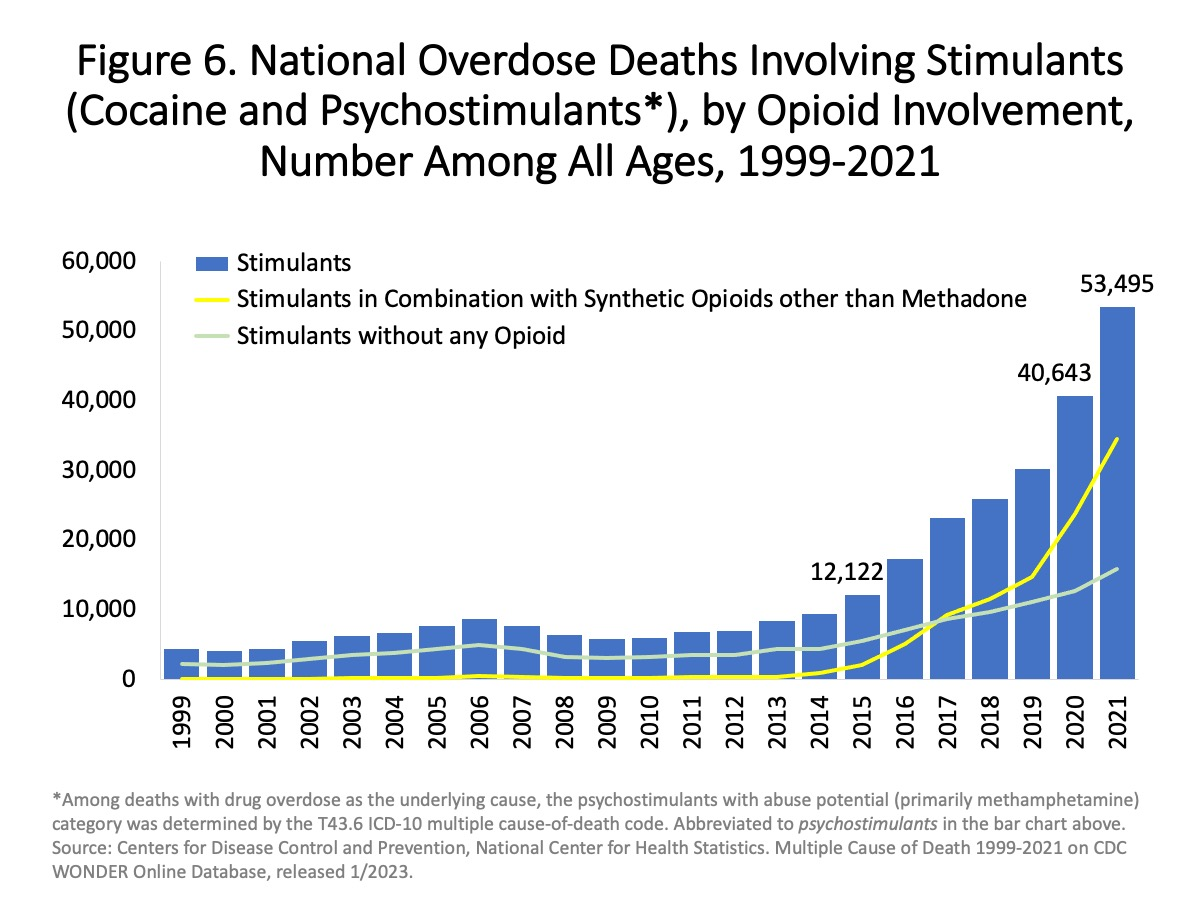
Timeline of US overdose deaths involving stimulants (cocaine and psychostimulants), by opioid involvement

In the United States, those living in rural areas of the country have been the hardest hit. According to Rita Noonan from the CDC, in rural areas, the overall death rate for accidental injuries is 50% higher than in urban areas. Differences in a multitude of factors, such as income, social supports, and accessibility to health care resources, have led to rural communities majorly exceeding urban areas when it comes to the rate of opioid-involved overdose deaths.

Between 1999 and 2017, Non-Hispanic Black populations in medium-small metropolitan regions saw a growth of opioid overdoses at 12.3%, while non-Hispanic whites in non-metropolitan areas had an increase of 13.6% annually. Urban Black Americans had the largest rise in overdose rates between 2013 and 2017, with younger (aged 55 years) and older adults seeing increases of 178% and 87%, respectively. However, Black individuals living in urban areas had the largest rise in fentanyl-related fatalities during the same time period.

Prescription rates for opioids vary widely across states. In 2012, healthcare providers in the highest-prescribing state wrote almost three times as many opioid prescriptions per person as those in the lowest-prescribing state. Health issues that cause people pain do not vary much from place to place and do not explain this variability in prescribing. Researchers suspect that the variation results from a lack of consensus among elected officials in different states about how much pain medication to prescribe. A higher rate of prescription drug use does not lead to better health outcomes or patient satisfaction, according to studies.

In Palm Beach County, Florida, overdose deaths went from 149 in 2012 to 588 in 2016. In Middletown, Ohio, overdose deaths quadrupled in the 15 years since 2000. In British Columbia, 967 people died of an opiate overdose in 2016, and the Canadian Medical Association expected over 1,500 deaths in 2017. In Pennsylvania, the number of opioid deaths increased 44 percent from 2016 to 2017, with 5,200 deaths in 2017. Governor Tom Wolf declared a state of emergency in response to the crisis.

Table: Opioid prescriptions per 100 persons in 2012.
State	Opioid prescriptions written	Rank
Alabama	142.9	1
Alaska	65.1	46
Arizona	82.4	26
Arkansas	115.8	8
California	57	50
Colorado	71.2	40
Connecticut	72.4	38
Delaware	90.8	17
District of Columbia	85.7	23
Florida	72.7	37
Georgia	90.7	18
Hawaii	52	51
Idaho	85.6	24
Illinois	67.9	43
Indiana	109.1	9
Iowa	72.8	36
Kansas	93.8	16
Kentucky	128.4	4
Louisiana	118	7
Maine	85.1	25
Maryland	74.3	33
Massachusetts	70.8	41
Michigan	107	10
Minnesota	61.6	48
Mississippi	120.3	6
Missouri	94.8	14
Montana	82	27
Nebraska	79.4	28
Nevada	94.1	15
New Hampshire	71.7	39
New Jersey	62.9	47
New Mexico	73.8	35
New York	59.5	49
North Carolina	96.6	13
North Dakota	74.7	32
Ohio	100.1	12
Oklahoma	127.8	5
Oregon	89.2	20
Pennsylvania	88.2	21
Rhode Island	89.6	19
South Carolina	101.8	11
South Dakota	66.5	45
Tennessee	142.8	2
Texas	74.3	34
Utah	85.8	22
Vermont	67.4	44
Virginia	77.5	29
Washington	77.3	30
West Virginia	137.6	3
Wisconsin	76.1	31
Wyoming	69.6	42

== Impact ==
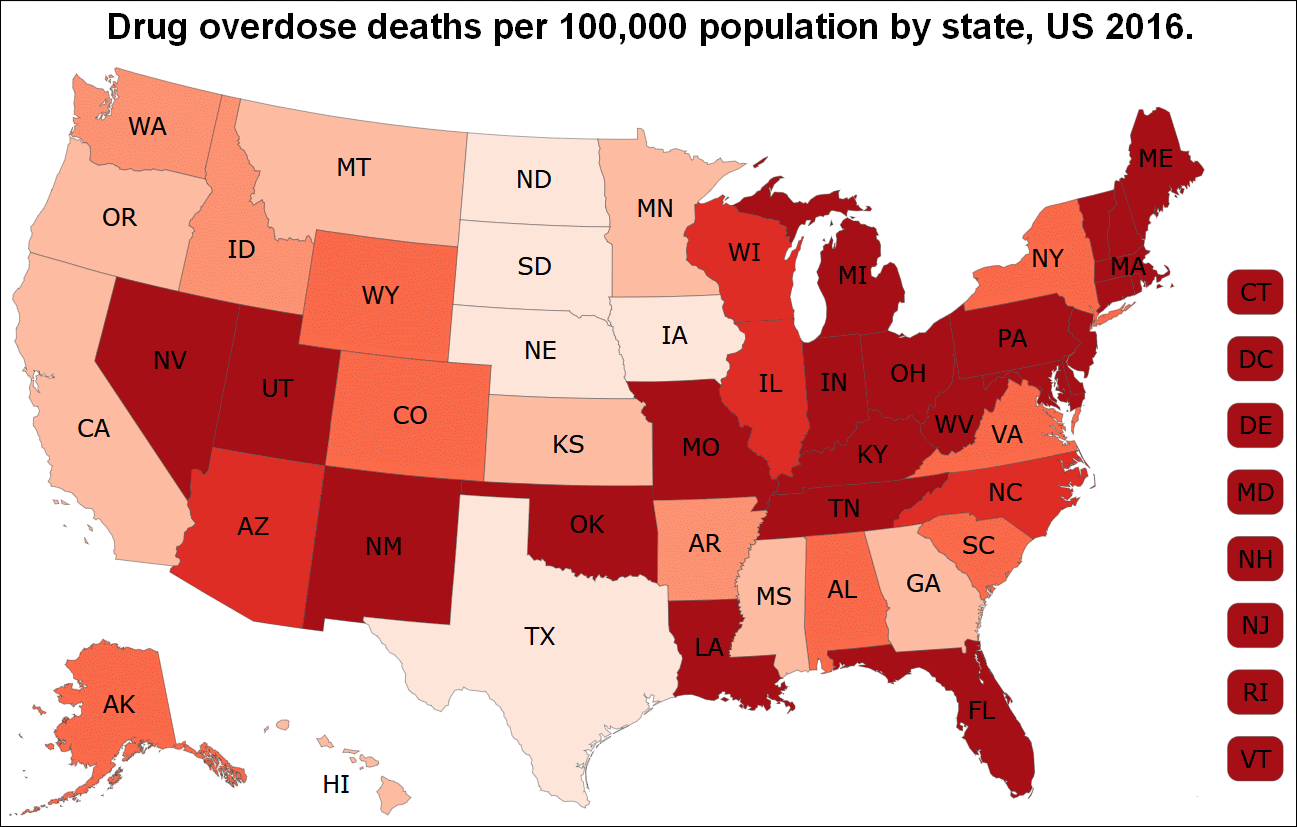
6.9–11 11.1–13.5 13.6–16.0 16.1–18.5 18.6–21.0 21.1–52.0 Of the 64,070 overdose deaths in the US in 2016, opioids were involved in 42,249. In 2016, the five states with the highest rates of death due to drug overdose were West Virginia (52.0 per 100,000), Ohio (39.1 per 100,000), New Hampshire (39.0 per 100,000), Pennsylvania (37.9 per 100,000) and Kentucky (33.5 per 100,000).

Drug overdose deaths in the US per 100,000 people by state

The high death rate by overdose, the spread of communicable diseases, and the economic burden are major issues caused by the epidemic, which has emerged as one of the worst drug crises in American history. More than 33,000 people died from overdoses in 2015, nearly equal to the number of deaths from car crashes, with the deaths from heroin alone outnumbering gun homicides. It has also left thousands of children suddenly in need of foster care after their parents have died from an overdose.

A 2016 study showed the cost of prescription opioid overdoses, non-medical use, and dependence in the United States in 2013 was approximately $78.5 billion, most of which was attributed to health care and criminal justice spending, along with lost productivity. By 2015 the epidemic had worsened with overdose and with deaths doubling in the past decade. The White House stated on November 20, 2017, that in 2015 alone the opioid epidemic cost the United States an estimated $504 billion.

Two employees of the University of Notre Dame were killed in a murder-suicide over the refusal of Dr. Todd Graham, 56, to renew the opioid prescription for the wife of Mike Jarvis, 48. United States Representative Jackie Walorski sponsored a bill in the memory of the doctor who would not over-prescribe; the Dr. Todd Graham Pain Management Improvement Act is intended to address the opioid epidemic.

The National Safety Council calculated that the lifetime odds of dying from an opioid overdose (1 in 96) in 2017 were greater than the lifetime odds of dying in an automobile accident (1 in 103) in the United States.

The opioid epidemic, combined with the Patient Protection and Affordable Care Act, has led to a situation called the Florida shuffle, where a drug user moves between drug rehabilitation centers so those centers may bill the user's insurance company.

In one study, a decision analytical model of the US population aged 12 years or older found that "under the status quo, an estimated 484,429 individuals were projected to die of fatal opioid overdose" between 2020 and 2029. However, a combination of "reducing opioid prescribing, increasing naloxone distribution, and expanding treatment for opioid use disorder was associated with an estimated 179,151 lives saved when compared to the status quo."

Healthcare professionals are also among those heavily affected by this epidemic. Studies have been done to determine how well nursing students, nurses, and even doctors are prepared to treat patients affected by opioid addictions. The studies have pointed to the fact that nurses and other healthcare professionals are highly undertrained in this area. As a result, many specific education programs have been proposed and implemented into nursing education institutions.

=== Treatment and effects during COVID-19 pandemic ===
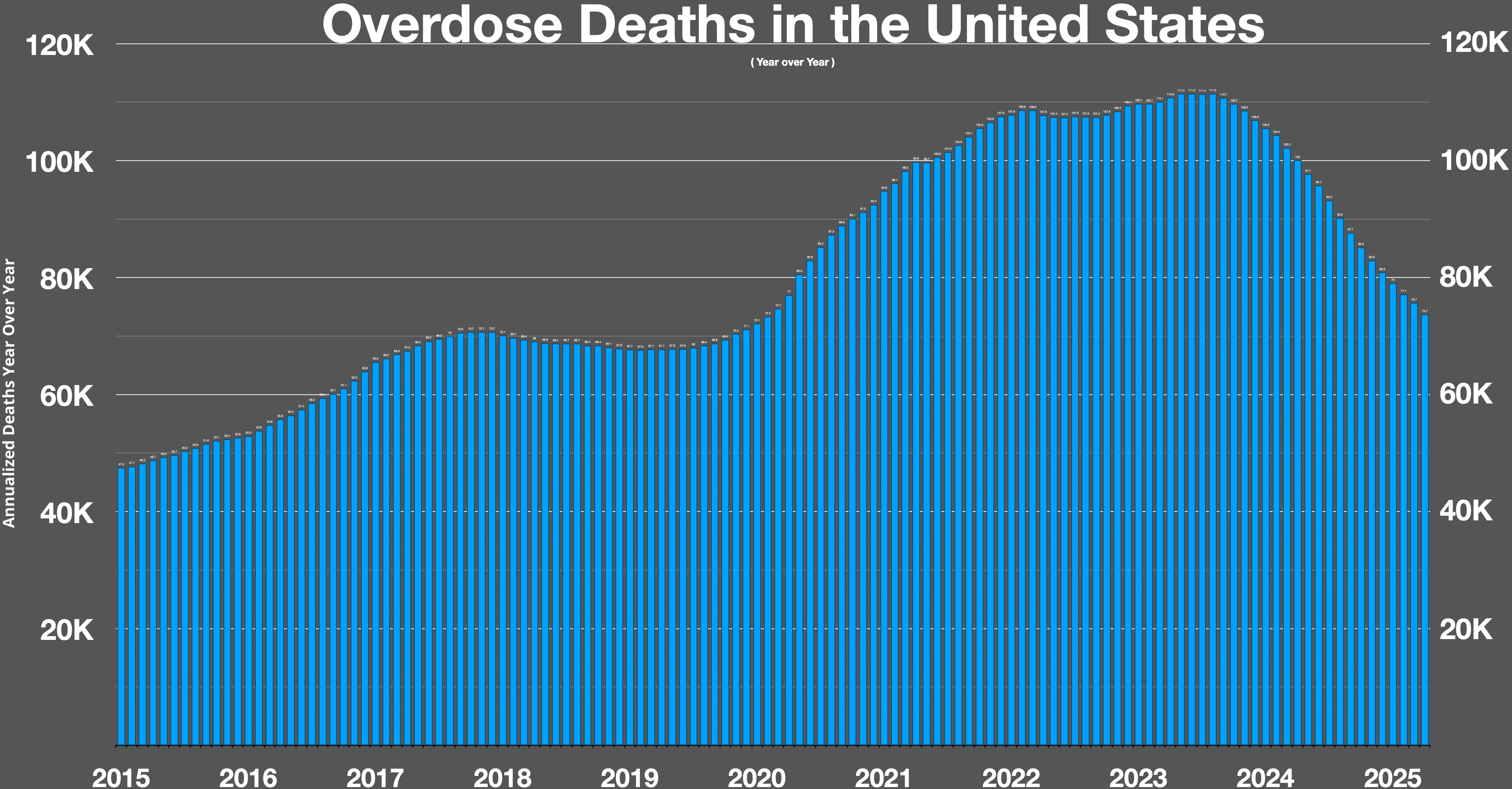
Overdose deaths in the United States

After slight decreases in opioid fatalities 2017–2018, overdose deaths in the US increased in 2019, due largely to an increase in non-medical use of fentanyl. The COVID-19 pandemic's interference with both social safety and health care delivery systems has intensified the opioid epidemic. US media, on national, state, and local levels, infer that overdose deaths are increasing. But there is no national reporting system on overdose mortality to confirm these reports. Conclusions on the relationship between increasing overdose fatalities and the COVID-19 pandemic will require more research. Studies, such as those by Wainwright et al. and Ochalek et al. estimate that opioid use and overdose deaths may be increasing, just as reported by the media. But more study is needed.

Statistics reveal that during the COVID-19 epidemic, drug overdoses increased. According to statistics from the Centers for Disease Control and Prevention, there were 91,799 overdose fatalities in the United States in 2020, a more than 30% rise from 2019. Drug-related overdose fatalities increased to more over 106,000 in 2021, the greatest number of overdose deaths recorded in a 12-month period. Most of these deaths were caused by synthetic opioids other than methadone (mostly fentanyl or analogues) and methamphetamine. During this time, non-Hispanic Black and non-Hispanic American Indian populations had the highest rate of overdose deaths, and non-Hispanic American Indian and white populations had the greatest increase in overdose rates. Further, during the first year of the COVID-19 pandemic, overdose disparities widened between Black persons and White persons. For example, in 2020, overdose rates among Black men 65 years or older (52.6 per 100 000) were nearly 7 times those of White men of the same age (7.7 per 100 000).

During times of economic distress such as the COVID-19 pandemic or the 2008 recession, harmful rates of drug use has been seen to increase in populations experiencing joblessness and disadvantaged populations; moreover, Carpenter et al. found evidence that economic downturns lead to increases in the intensity of prescription pain reliever use as well as increases in clinically significant substance use disorders involving opioids.

In addition, the COVID-19 pandemic has marked the start of health care policies that, should they be adopted permanently, could not only lessen the effects of the pandemic on overdoses, but also make overall treatment of opioid use disorder more effective by eliminating obstacles to previously proven therapies for these disorders.

Other studies have looked at treatments for OUD during the COVID-19 pandemic. For example, one JAMA Internal Medicine research letter from December 2020 found that since the COVID-19 national emergency declaration, "the number of individuals filling buprenorphine prescriptions has plateaued but has not decreased; however, filled prescriptions for all medications collectively have decreased considerably."

== Countermeasures ==
=== US federal government ===
In 2010, the US government began cracking down on pharmacists and doctors who were overprescribing opioid painkillers. An unintended consequence of this was that those addicted to prescription opiates turned to heroin, a significantly more potent but cheaper opioid, as a substitute. A 2017 survey in Utah of heroin users found about 80 percent started with prescription drugs.

In 2010, the Controlled Substances Act was amended with the Secure and Responsible Drug Disposal Act, which allows pharmacies to accept controlled substances from households or long-term care facilities in their drug disposal programs or "take-back" programs.

In 2011, the federal government released a white paper describing the administration's plan to deal with the crisis. Its concerns have been echoed by numerous medical and government advisory groups around the world. In July 2016, President Barack Obama signed into law the Comprehensive Addiction and Recovery Act, which expands opioid addiction treatment with buprenorphine and authorizes millions of dollars in funding for opioid research and treatment.

In 2011, the Obama administration began to deal with the crisis, and in 2016, President Barack Obama authorized millions of dollars in funding for opioid research and treatment, followed by CDC director Thomas Frieden stating that "America is awash in opioids; urgent action is critical." Soon after, many state governors declared a "state of emergency" to combat the opioid epidemic in their own states, and undertook major efforts to stop it. In July 2017, opioid addiction was cited as the "Food and Drug Administration's biggest crisis", followed by President Donald Trump declaring the opioid crisis a "national emergency." In September 2019, he ordered U.S. mail carriers to block shipments of fentanyl coming from other countries.

In 2016, the US Surgeon General listed statistics which describe the extent of the problem. The House and Senate passed the Ensuring Patient Access and Effective Drug Enforcement Act which was signed into law by President Obama on April 19, 2016, and may have decreased the DEA's ability to intervene in the opioid crisis. In December 2016, the 21st Century Cures Act, which includes $1 billion in state grants to fight the opioid epidemic, was passed by Congress by a wide bipartisan majority (94–5 in the Senate, 392–26 in the House of Representatives), and was signed into law by President Obama.

As of March 2017, President Donald Trump appointed a commission on the epidemic, chaired by Governor Chris Christie of New Jersey. On August 10, 2017, President Trump agreed with his commission's report released a few weeks earlier and declared the country's opioid crisis a "national emergency". Trump nominated Representative Tom Marino to be director of the Office of National Drug Control Policy, or "drug czar". One interview in 2015 with the then Director of the White House Office of National Drug Control Policy under the Obama administration, Michael Botticelli, where he states that because opioid users are predominantly 'white and middle class', they "know how to call a legislator, [and] fight with their insurance company."

In October 2017, Marino withdrew his nomination after it was reported that his relationship with the drug industry might be a conflict of interest. In July 2017, FDA commissioner Scott Gottlieb stated that for the first time, pharmacists, nurses, and physicians would have training made available on appropriate prescribing of opioid medicines, because opioid addiction had become the "FDA's biggest crisis". Trump nominated his then deputy chief-of-staff, James Carroll as the acting director of the Office of National Drug Control Policy in 2018. In January 2019, Carroll was approved by the Senate.

In April 2017, the Department of Health and Human Services announced their "Opioid Strategy" consisting of five aims:

1. Improve access to prevention, treatment, and recovery support services to prevent the health, social, and economic consequences associated with opioid addiction and to enable individuals to achieve long-term recovery;
2. Target the availability and distribution of overdose-reversing drugs to ensure the broad provision of these drugs to people likely to experience or respond to an overdose, with a particular focus on targeting high-risk populations;
3. Strengthen public health data reporting and collection to improve the timeliness and specificity of data and to inform a real-time public health response as the epidemic evolves;
4. Support cutting-edge research that advances our understanding of pain and addiction, leads to the development of new treatments, and identifies effective public health interventions to reduce opioid-related health harms; and
5. Advance the practice of pain management to enable access to high-quality, evidence-based pain care that reduces the burden of pain for individuals, families, and society while also reducing the inappropriate use of opioids and opioid-related harms.

The US Food and Drug Administration (FDA) has taken another approach to this epidemic: requiring manufacturers of long-acting opioids to sponsor educational programs for prescribers. The FDA hoped that these educational programs would help deter off-label and overprescribing; however, it is still unclear if these programs truly have a positive effect on reducing opioid prescriptions. In March 2019, two FDA specialists publicly demanded that the FDA suspend new opioid approvals, alleging that the FDA's oversight of opioid approvals had been dangerously deficient.

In July 2017, a 400-page report by the National Academy of Sciences presented plans to reduce the addiction crisis, which it said was killing 91 people each day.

The Substance Abuse and Mental Health Services Administration administers the Opioid State Targeted Response grants, a two-year program authorized by the 21st Century Cures Act which provided $485 million to states and US territories in the fiscal year 2017 for the purpose of preventing and combatting opioid misuse and addiction.

Thomas Frieden, former director of the Centers for Disease Control and Prevention, said that "America is awash in opioids; urgent action is critical." The crisis has changed moral, social, and cultural resistance to street drug alternatives such as heroin. Many state governors have declared a "state of emergency" to combat the opioid epidemic or undertaken other major efforts against it. In July 2017, opioid addiction was cited as the "FDA's biggest crisis".

In October 2017, President Donald Trump concurred with his Commission's report and declared the country's opioid crisis a "public health emergency". Federal and state interventions are working on employing health information technology in order to expand the impact of existing drug monitoring programs. Recent research shows promising results in mortality and morbidity reductions when a state integrates drug monitoring programs with health information technologies and shares data through a centralized platform.

The Substance Use-Disorder Prevention that Promotes Opioid Recovery and Treatment for Patients and Communities Act, or the SUPPORT for Patients and Communities Act, was introduced by the US House of Representatives on June 22, 2018, and was advanced on June 22, 2018. The bill includes Medicare and Medicaid reform in order to improve treatment, recovery, and prevention efforts while also strengthening the fight against synthetic drugs like fentanyl.

In September 2018, the US Senate approved the SUPPORT for Patients and Communities Act (H.R. 6). The committee reached a final agreement on terms of the bill on September 25, 2018. The final agreement included provisions from multiple other acts, such as The Opioid Crisis Response Act of 2018, The Helping to End Addiction and Lessen (HEAL) Substance Use Disorders Act of 2018, and the Synthetics Trafficking and Overdose Prevention (STOP) Act of 2018. The House and The Senate passed the final draft on September 28 and October 3, respectively. President Donald Trump signed the package into law on October 28, 2018.

In July 2019, English multinational consumer goods corporation Reckitt Benckiser, parent of US pharmaceutical company Indivior, agreed to pay $1.4 billion to the U.S. Department of Justice and the Federal Trade Commission to resolve false marketing claims about the effectiveness of its opioid addiction drug, Suboxone, and to resolve charges over their scheme to direct patients towards doctors who were likely to prescribe Suboxone.

In September 2019, President Trump issued an executive order to block shipments of fentanyl and counterfeit goods from other countries, where illegal distributors were using regular mail for deliveries. While China was a focus for the action, the order included any nation where it was either manufactured or shipped from. Trump claimed that the Chinese government had not done enough to stop the smuggling of fentanyl manufactured there:

I am ordering all carriers, including FedEx, Amazon, UPS and the Post Office, to search for and refuse all deliveries of fentanyl from China (or anywhere else!). Fentanyl kills 100,000 Americans a year. President Xi said this would stop – it didn't.

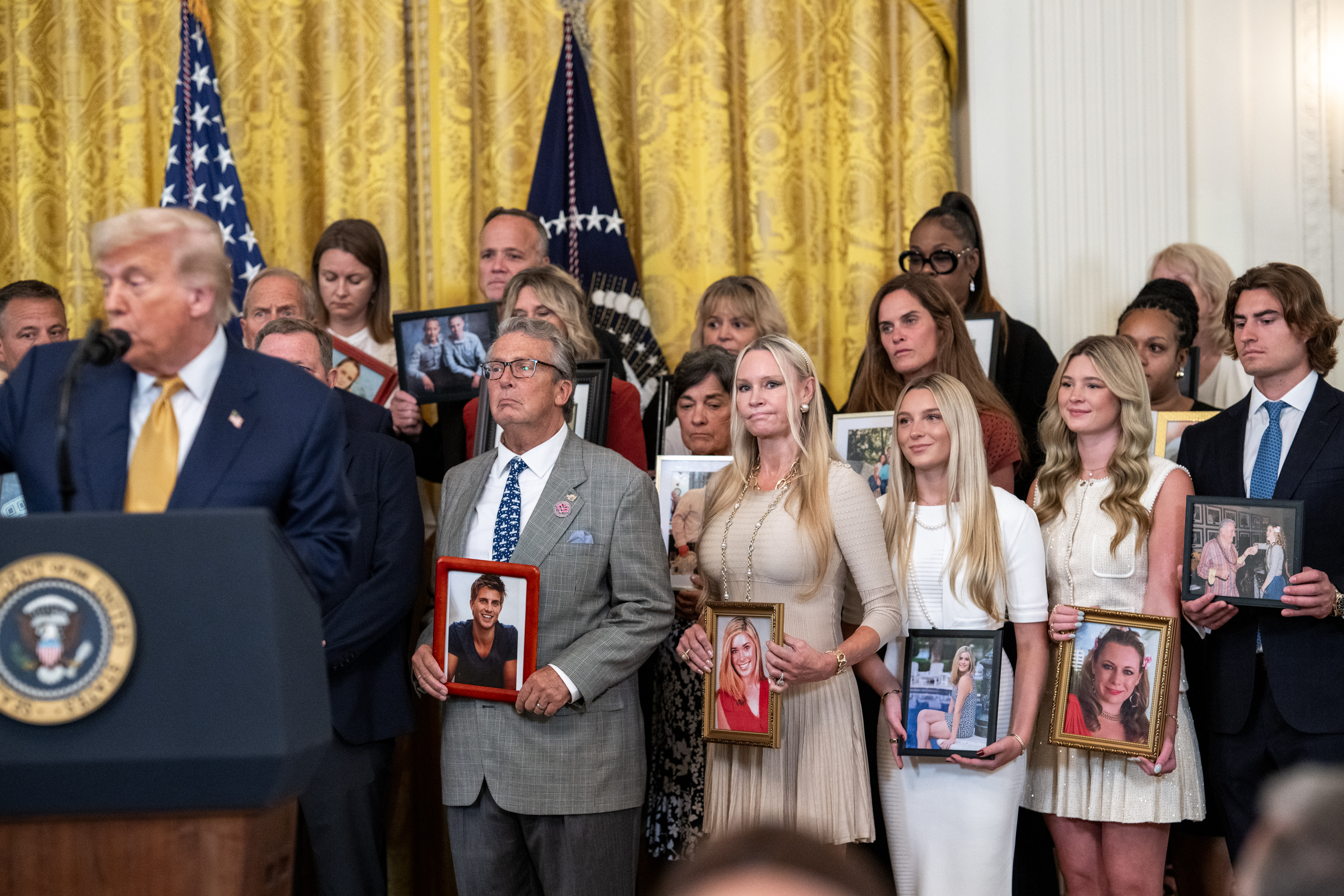
President Trump at the signing ceremony of the HALT Fentanyl Act, July 16, 2025

A March 2020 report by ProPublica revealed that Walmart used its political influence with the Trump administration to avoid criminal prosecution for over-dispensing opioids in Texas.

In July 2020, Indivior Solutions, Indivior Inc., and Indivior plc agreed to pay $600 million to resolve liability related to false marketing of Suboxone to MassHealth for use by patients with children under the age of six years old. Additionally, Indivior Solutions pled guilty to one-count of felony information.

On December 15, 2025, Trump signed Executive Order 14367 classifying fentanyl as a "weapon of mass destruction".

=== State and local governments ===
In response to the surging opioid prescription rates by health care providers that contributed to the opioid epidemic in the United States, US states began passing legislation to stifle high-risk prescribing practices (such as prescribing high doses of opioids or prescribing opioids long-term). These new laws fell primarily into one of the following four categories:

1. Prescription Drug Monitoring Program (PDMP) enrollment laws: prescribers must enroll in their state's PDMP, an electronic database containing a record of all patients' controlled substance prescriptions
2. PDMP query laws: prescribers must check the PDMP before prescribing an opioid
3. Opioid prescribing cap laws: opioid prescriptions cannot exceed designated doses or durations
4. Pill mill laws: pain clinics are closely regulated and monitored to minimize the prescription of opioids non-medically

=== Legal action ===
In May 2019, in the first successful prosecution of top pharmaceutical executives for crimes related to the prescribing of opioids, the founder and four former executives of Insys Therapeutics Inc. were convicted by a federal jury in Boston in connection with bribing medical practitioners to prescribe Subsys, a highly-addictive sublingual fentanyl spray intended for cancer patients experiencing breakthrough pain, and for defrauding Medicare and private insurance carriers. The company declared bankruptcy about two weeks after they lost the case.

Dozens of states are suing pharmaceutical companies, accusing them of causing the epidemic. Suits filed by almost 2,000 cities, counties, and tribal lands have been rolled into a single federal case scheduled to be heard in Fall 2019. In the first state case to reach a decision, on August 26, 2019, Oklahoma district court judge Thad Balkman found the pharmaceutical company Johnson & Johnson responsible for creating a "public nuisance" under state law, and ordered the company to pay a fine of $572 million. The company said they will appeal.

Two other drug makers had previously settled with the state of Oklahoma. Purdue Pharma, the maker of OxyContin, agreed to a fine of $270 million in March 2019, and Teva Pharmaceuticals, which makes generic drugs, agreed to pay $85 million in May.

==== Ohio jury trial ====
In October 2021, a landmark trial began in a Cleveland court. The defendants are pharmacy chains and operators, including Walmart, Walgreens and CVS. These chains are accused of not having enough trained staff and sophisticated systems to responsibly dispense opioids. Lawyers allege that pharmacies have not fulfilled their legal responsibility to act as a "last line of defense," and that the chains enable illegal street dealing of prescription opioids.

Lake and Trumbull Counties in northeast Ohio were the plaintiffs and alleged the chains had "substantially contributed to the crisis of opioid overdose and deaths…." in the counties. In November 2021, a 12-person jury, after five and a half days of deliberation, held the retailers accountable for contributing to a "public nuisance." This was the first jury verdict in the decades-long crisis. The retailers said they would appeal the jury's verdict.

On August 17, 2022, CVS, Walgreens and Walmart were forced to pay out $650.5 million to Lake and Trumbull County.

==== States reject distributors' settlement ====
In February 2020, 21 US states turned down an $18 billion (US), 18-year offer from McKesson Corporation, Cardinal Health Inc, and AmerisourceBergen Corp. that would have resolved litigation against the pharmaceutical companies over their distribution of the addictive painkillers. A letter from the attorneys general of Ohio, Florida and Connecticut (among others) said the settlement, as "currently structured," was not acceptable to the states. This particular offer was part of the proposed $50 billion (US) agreement to find a resolution to over 2,000 lawsuits from both local and state governments attempting to recoup billions of dollars they have spent combatting the crisis.

==== July 2021 settlement ====
Four major drug manufacturers and distributors, J&J, McKesson, Cardinal Health, and AmerisourceBergen, have agreed to a settlement announced by a group of state attorneys general in July 2021. The settlement, $26 billion (US), will be used on the prevention of opioid addiction and treatment programs. J&J will pay $5 billion (US) over the next five years; the remaining $21 billion (US) will be paid by the other firms. The settlement, when approved by a "significant" group of states and local governments, will settle more than 4,000 individual legal actions. All four of the manufacturing firms disputed all allegations in the lawsuits.

==== Cleveland Settlement ====
The United States' three largest pharmaceutical distributors, AmerisourceBergen, Cardinal Health and McKesson Corporation reached an agreement in October 2019 where they will pay two Ohio counties a combined US$215 million. As part of the deal, Israel drug manufacturer Teva will also provide US$20 million in cash and US$25 million worth of Suboxone, an opioid addiction treatment. Cuyahoga County (Cleveland) and Summit County (Akron) brought the suit in US Federal District Court (Northern District of Ohio). The settlement averted what would have been the first federal trial over the US opioid crisis. The defendants offered no admission of wrongdoing.

More than 2,600 lawsuits against the US pharmaceutical industry are still in the offing. The plaintiffs in those cases said the Ohio settlement allows them time to attempt to negotiate a national settlement. It also pressures the participants to work out a deal, as every partial settlement diminishes the aggregate total the companies will be able to pay.

The two counties had reached a similar settlement of US$20.4 million with Johnson & Johnson and its subsidiary Ethicon, Inc. earlier in October 2019.

=== Homicide by overdose ===
Homicide by overdose is the act of giving someone a specified controlled substance which causes that person to die. They are considered an easy way to murder an addict as no one will suspect it's anything but a routine overdose. However states are charging people even when the overdose was unintentional.

As of 2019, half of all US states have "homicide-by-overdose" or "drug-induced homicide" (DIH) laws. While these laws date back to the 1980s, they were originally used infrequently. Prosecutions dramatically increased in the 21st century. (In 2000, there were 2 prosecutions; in 2017, there were 717 prosecutions.) In 2017, legislators in at least 13 states introduced bills to enhance these laws or create new ones.

=== Prescription drug monitoring ===
In 2016, the CDC published its "Guideline for Prescribing Opioids for Chronic Pain", recommending opioids only be used when benefits for pain and function are expected to outweigh risks, and then used at the lowest effective dosage, with avoidance of concurrent opioid and benzodiazepine use whenever possible. Silvia Martins, an epidemiologist at Columbia University, has suggested getting out more information about the risks:

The greater "social acceptance" for using these medications (versus illegal substances) and the misconception that they are "safe" may be contributing factors to their misuse.

Hence, a major target for intervention is the general public, including parents and youth, who must be better informed about the negative consequences of sharing with others medications prescribed for their own ailments. Equally important is the improved training of medical practitioners and their staff to better recognize patients at potential risk of developing nonmedical use, and to consider potential alternative treatments as well as closely monitor the medications they dispense to these patients. As of April 2017, prescription drug monitoring programs (PDMPs) exist in every state. A person on opioids for more than three months has a 15-fold (1,500%) greater chance of becoming addicted.

The CDC's "Guideline for Prescribing Opioids for Chronic Pain" offers many non-pharmacological options as alternatives to prescribing opioids. Physical therapist interventions is an example that is offered in regards to an alternative to prescribing opioids.

PDMPs allow pharmacists and prescribers to access patients' prescription histories to identify suspicious use. However, a survey of US physicians published in 2015 found only 53% of doctors used these programs, while 22% were not aware these programs were available. Following the implementation of pill mill laws and prescription drug monitoring programs in Florida, there was a large decline in opioid prescriptions written by high-risk prescribers (those prescribing the top 5th of opioids by volume). The Centers for Disease Control and Prevention (CDC) was tasked with establishing and publishing a new guideline, and was heavily lobbied.

A 2018 study by the University of Florida concluded that there is little evidence that drug-monitoring databases are having a positive effect on the number of drug overdoses in the US. Researcher Chris Delcher also concluded that "there was a concurrent rise in fatal overdoses from fentanyl, heroin and morphine" due to ease of availability and lower cost following prescription drug crackdowns.

The American Medical Association (AMA) has created an Opioid Task Force for helping physicians to combat the epidemic. The AMA has suggested 6 actions for physicians to take:

1. Register and use state prescription drug monitoring programs
2. Enhance education and training
3. Support comprehensive treatment for pain and substance use disorders
4. Help end stigma
5. Co-prescribe naloxone to patients at risk of overdose
6. Encourage safe storage and disposal of opioids and all medications.

The Opioid Task Force 2018 Progress Report states that between 2013 and 2017 opioid prescriptions have decreased by 22.2%, which includes a 9% decrease from 2016 to 2017 alone. The AMA Opioid Task Force also reports a 389% increase in physician participation in PDMPs. Further, physicians are encouraged to co-prescribe naloxone to those at risk of overdose. In 2017 alone, weekly filled naloxone prescriptions have more than doubled from 3,500 to 8,000 and more than 50,000 physicians were certified in 2017 to provide in-office buprenorphine. Patrice A. Harris, chair of the AMA Opioid Task Force, urges increased participation by physicians, saying "what is needed now is a concerted effort to greatly expand access to high quality care for pain and for substance use disorders. Unless and until we do that, this epidemic will not end."

=== In the media ===
Media coverage has largely focused on law-enforcement solutions to the epidemic, which portray the issue as criminal, whereas some see it as a medical issue. There has been differential reporting on how white suburban or rural addicts of opioids are portrayed compared to black and Hispanic urban addicts, often of heroin, reinforcing stereotypes of drug users and drug-using offenders. In newspapers, white addicts' stories are often given more space, allowing for a longer backstory explaining how they became addicted, and what potential they had before using drugs. In early 2016 the national desk of The Washington Post began an investigation with assistance from fired Drug Enforcement Administration regulator Joseph Razzazzisi on the rapidly increasing numbers of opioid related deaths.

While media coverage has focused more heavily on overdoses among whites, use among African, Hispanic and Native Americans has increased at similar rates. Deaths by overdose among white, black, and Native Americans increased by 200–300% from 2010 to 2014. During this time period, overdoses among Hispanics increased 140%, and the data available on overdoses by Asians was not comprehensive enough to draw a conclusion.

In August 2014, the website Annals of Emergency Medicine collaborated with the Academic Life in Emergency Medicine (ALiEM) and posted a discussion board about the opioid epidemic. The discussion acquired a little over 1000 readers and lasted roughly 14 days. There were four questions posted on the discussion that encouraged readers to share their opinions on how opioids should be prescribed and used.

==== DEA Data ====
In July 2019 the Washington Post and the Charleston (WV) Gazette-Mail gained a court order after a year-long battle with the Drug Enforcement Administration (DEA). The order allowed the Post access to the DEA Automation of Reports and Consolidated Orders System (ARCOS), a system that traces the manufacture, distribution and retail sale of every pain pill in the US. The Post's analysis of the data indicated 76 billion oxycodone and hydrocodone pain pills were distributed throughout the US 2006–2012. 57 billion (75%) of these pain pills were distributed by these companies: McKesson Corporation, Walgreens, Cardinal Health, AmerisourceBergen, CVS and Walmart.

Nearly 67 billion (88%) of the drugs were manufactured by SpecGx, a subsidiary of Mallinckrodt; Actavis Pharma; and Par Pharmaceutical, a subsidiary of Endo Pharmaceuticals. The greatest number of pills/person were found in West Virginia – 66.5; Kentucky – 63.3; Tennessee – 57.7; and Nevada – 54.7. The highest opioid overdose rate 2006-2012 was in West Virginia. Rural communities were hit particularly hard. 306 pills/person/year were shipped to Norton VA; 242 to Martinsville VA; 203 the Mingo County WV; and 175 to Perry County KY.

=== Treatment ===
The opioid epidemic is often discussed in terms of prevention, but helping those who are already addicted is addressed less frequently. Opioid dependence can lead to a number of consequences like contraction of HIV and overdose. For addicted persons who wish to treat their addiction, there are two classes of treatment options available: medical and behavioral. Neither is guaranteed to successfully treat opioid addiction. Which treatment, or combination of treatments, is most effective varies from person to person.

These treatments are doctor-prescribed and -regulated, but differ in their treatment mechanism. Popular treatments include kratom, naloxone, methadone, and buprenorphine, which are more effective when combined with a form of behavioral treatment.

Accessing treatment, however, can be difficult. The strict regulation of opioid treatment programs dates back to the early 20th century. Before 1919, physicians prescribed milder forms of opiates to help wean patients off opium. In Webb v. United States, the Supreme Court ruled that doctors could no longer prescribe narcotics to aid in treating a narcotic use disorder. Thus, morphine dispensaries emerged in communities to fill the treatment gap and were the early precedents to modern methadone clinics.

It is still difficult for providers to prescribe opioids for medication-assisted treatment despite the data that show individuals addicted to opioids have better outcomes with that than abstinence-based treatment programs. Programs are required to be accredited by SAMHSA or the Drug Enforcement Administration which is a lengthy, time- and resource-consuming process including intensive training and site visit reviews. To stay in operation, they must submit to re-accreditation every 1–3 years.

Accredited programs are also able to administer buprenorphine, provided that those prescribing and administering the drug have completed the 8–24 hours of SAMHSA training. Office-based physicians who wish to prescribe buprenorphine for the treatment of opioid use disorder must also complete the required training, as well as apply for and receive a waiver from SAMHSA. Under regulation, physicians may not have more than 30 buprenorphine patients in their first year of prescribing the drug. They may apply to have this limit increased to 100 patients by year two and 275 patients by year three.

In December 2015, the US Government Accountability Office began a survey of the laws and regulations around opioid treatment programs and medication-assisted treatment and found that they were barriers to getting people with opioid use disorders the treatment they need. Despite the fact that there is a shortage of opioid treatment programs across the United States, many clinicians do not want to start their own because the time and effort required to comply with the regulations is prohibitive.

Individual-level barriers to accessing medication-assisted treatment also exist. The federal regulations regarding program admission into treatment programs are considered "high-threshold." Individuals seeking treatment must meet several criteria to be eligible for treatment. These criteria require potential patients to:

1. Have a diagnosable opioid use disorder, according to the DSM-5,
2. Be actively addicted to opioids at the time of intake, and
3. Have been addicted to opioids for at least one year before beginning treatment.

In addition to these federal criteria, each state may have its own criteria individuals must meet. The US GAO also cited the cost of treatment and lack of health insurance coverage for MAT as barriers for many addicted to opioids. While methadone treatments are covered by Medicaid for low-income individuals, the extent of coverage depends on which state they are in and if the state has opted into Medicaid expansion under the Affordable Care Act.

Buprenorphine, on the other hand, is not covered by Medicaid or, often, even by private health insurers. Because buprenorphine must typically be paid for out-of-pocket, lower-income individuals are often priced out of the lower-risk MAT. In some areas this creates major disparities along racial lines with the higher-risk treatment utilized by lower-income individuals - disproportionately represented by people of color - and the lower-risk treatment only accessible to higher-income individuals - disproportionately represented by whites.

Other individual-level barriers may include transportation, especially for those who live in rural areas. The nearest Opioid Treatment Program (OTP) could be up to an hour away, and when daily methadone doses are required for treatment, this may interfere with the success of the MAT or the client's compliance in the program. In rural Vermont, 48% of respondents in treatment reported they had missed an appointment due to travel challenges. Because of issues like these, it is estimated that, nationwide, only 10% of individuals who would be eligible to receive MAT actually receive the treatment.

The price of opioid treatment may vary due to different factors, but the cost of treatment can range from $6,000 to $15,000 a year. Based on the research, most addicts come from lagging economic environment which multiple addicts do not have the support or funding to complete alternative medication for the addictions.

==== Methadone ====
Methadone has been used for opioid dependence since 1964, and is the most-studied of the pharmacological treatment options. It is a synthetic long-acting opioid, so it can replace multiple heroin uses by being taken once daily. It works by binding to the opioid receptors in the brain and spinal cord, activating them, reducing withdrawal symptoms and cravings while suppressing the "high" that other opioids can elicit. The decrease in withdrawal symptoms and cravings allow the user to slowly taper off the drug in a controlled manner, decreasing the likelihood of relapse, though some jurisdictions allow for indefinite maintenance on a dose at which the patient is comfortable. It is not accessible to all addicts. It is a regulated substance, and requires that each dose be picked up from a methadone clinic daily, though some jurisdictions allow take home doses. This can be inconvenient as some patients are unable to travel to a clinic, or wish to avoid the stigma associated with drug addiction.

Treatment with methadone maintenance has been generally shown to significantly reduce mortality among opioid addicted populations. Its efficacy in reducing opioid use and positive treatment outcomes has been established, and is generally considered to be the "gold standard" of care for opiate addiction.

==== Buprenorphine ====
Buprenorphine is used similarly to methadone, with some doctors recommending it as the best solution for medication-assisted treatment to help people reduce or quit their use of heroin or other opiates. It is claimed to be safer and less regulated than methadone, with month-long prescriptions allowed. It is also said to eliminate opiate withdrawal symptoms and cravings in many patients without inducing euphoria. Probuphine is an implantable form of buprenorphine lasting six months. Rates of buprenorphine use increased between 2003 and 2011, with sales increasing, on average, by 40%.

Unlike methadone treatment, which must be performed in a highly structured clinic, buprenorphine, according to SAMHSA, can be prescribed or dispensed in physician offices. Patients can thereby receive a full year of treatment for a fraction of the cost of detox programs.

Buprenorphine/naloxone is a combination medication that has been approved by the FDA in 2002 for treatment of opioid dependence. It is a combination medication that contains two separate drugs: buprenorphine and naloxone.

Buprenorphine works as a partial opioid agonist. It is given in combination with Naloxone because Naloxone works as an opioid antagonist, meaning it will block the effects of the opioid medication. This combination medication can reduce a person's opioid withdrawal symptoms while they are discontinuing opioids after a period of long-term use.

While buprenorphine/naloxone is indicated for the treatment of opioid use disorder, it does contain an opioid which means a person may be at risk of developing dependence to it as well.

==== Behavioral treatment ====
Behavioral treatment is less effective without medical treatment during the initial detoxification. It has similarly been shown that medical treatments tend to get better results when accompanied by behavioral treatment. For opioid dependence, popular non-pharmacological treatment options include cognitive behavioral therapy (CBT), group or individual therapy, residential treatment centers, and twelve-step programs such as Narcotics Anonymous. Since addictive behavior is a learned behavior in opioid dependence, cognitive behavioral therapy aims to promote positive motivation to change that behavior. Studies such as the Rat Park series indicate that a greater focus on improving the environments of those with opioid use disorders could also be beneficial.

=== Harm reduction ===
Harm reduction programs operate under the understanding that certain levels of drug use are inevitable and focus on minimizing adverse effects associated with drug use. In the context of the opioid epidemic, harm reduction strategies are designed to improve health outcomes and reduce overdose deaths. Because many pain sufferers are also depressed, a challenge of harm reduction is that some applications, such as the use of drugs to reverse or avoid opioid overdose can nullify the effects of antidepressant medications which depend on the natural human opioid system.

One of the first serious efforts to spread the harm reduction practices to combat heroin overdoses in American and beyond occurred in a conference in Seattle in January 2001 called "Preventing Heroin Overdose: Pragmatic Approaches." The conference was co-sponsored by the Alcohol and Drug Abuse Institute at the University of Washington and the Lindesmith Center (later known as the Drug Policy Alliance), which was led by Ethan Nadelmann, financed by George Soros, and aimed to end the war on drugs and promote harm reduction. The conference brought "scholars, researchers, doctors and other health care providers, drug-treatment providers and a handful of police officials" from across North America and Europe together to discuss approaches in combatting heroin overdoses. While some strategies endorsed in the program, including needle-exchange programs and good samaritan laws, became mainstream in American drug policy, other approaches that were advocated at the conference, including safe injection sites, have yet to be widely endorsed in the United States. Nadelmann said at the time of the conference, "We could cut heroin overdoses in half if the information from this conference was widely disseminated."

==== Increasing Bystander Intervention ====
There are currently two types of laws in place to reduce opioid overdoses through increased bystander intervention: Good Samaritan Laws (GSLs) and Naloxone Access Laws (NALs). GSLs allow a bystander to not face civil damages when acting in good faith to provide emergency care in the event of an overdose, and NALs increase the distribution and accessibility of Naloxone. Research suggests that increasing naloxone access will be the second most effective intervention for reducing overdoses.

Most states have the following three or varying degrees of Naloxone access: third party distribution, pharmacist prescribing power, and standing orders. The standing order for naloxone allows for its distribution to a patient if they meet a certain criterion, which is most often the prescription of an opioid. The effectiveness of this legislation has been disputed since its success depends on the change in behavior of people who are present during an overdose and the accessibility of naloxone.

In 2001, New Mexico was the first state to create a NAL, which granted third-party prescribing and criminal immunity to prescribers. By 2017, all states had a NAL in place. Connecticut first implemented a GSL in 2011, and it has been updated yearly since 2014. Some research suggests that Connecticut's GSL has not affected overdose deaths but has resulted in positive behavioral changes with an increase of 9 calls; however, deaths may still continue to increase in spite of the increased awareness from GSLs.

From 2000 to 2014, McClellan et al. (2018) found that opioid overdose mortality decreased by 14% and 15% when laws increased the engagement of layperson intervention, respectively, through an increase in NALs or GSLs. NALs were related to greater reductions in mortality in Black populations, and GSLs were related to reductions of mortality in Black and Hispanic populations. Rees et al. (2019) found that NALs were associated with a statistically significant decrease in non-heroin opioid-related deaths. The adoption of a GSL resulted in a decrease of 12–19%; early adopters of NALs or those that passed NALs before 2011 experienced an 18–29% reduction in overdoses. However, it was also found that NALs were only effective on the Western coast, and the Eastern and Southern US experienced little impact due to fentanyl not fully reaching the West in 2014.

==== Naloxone ====
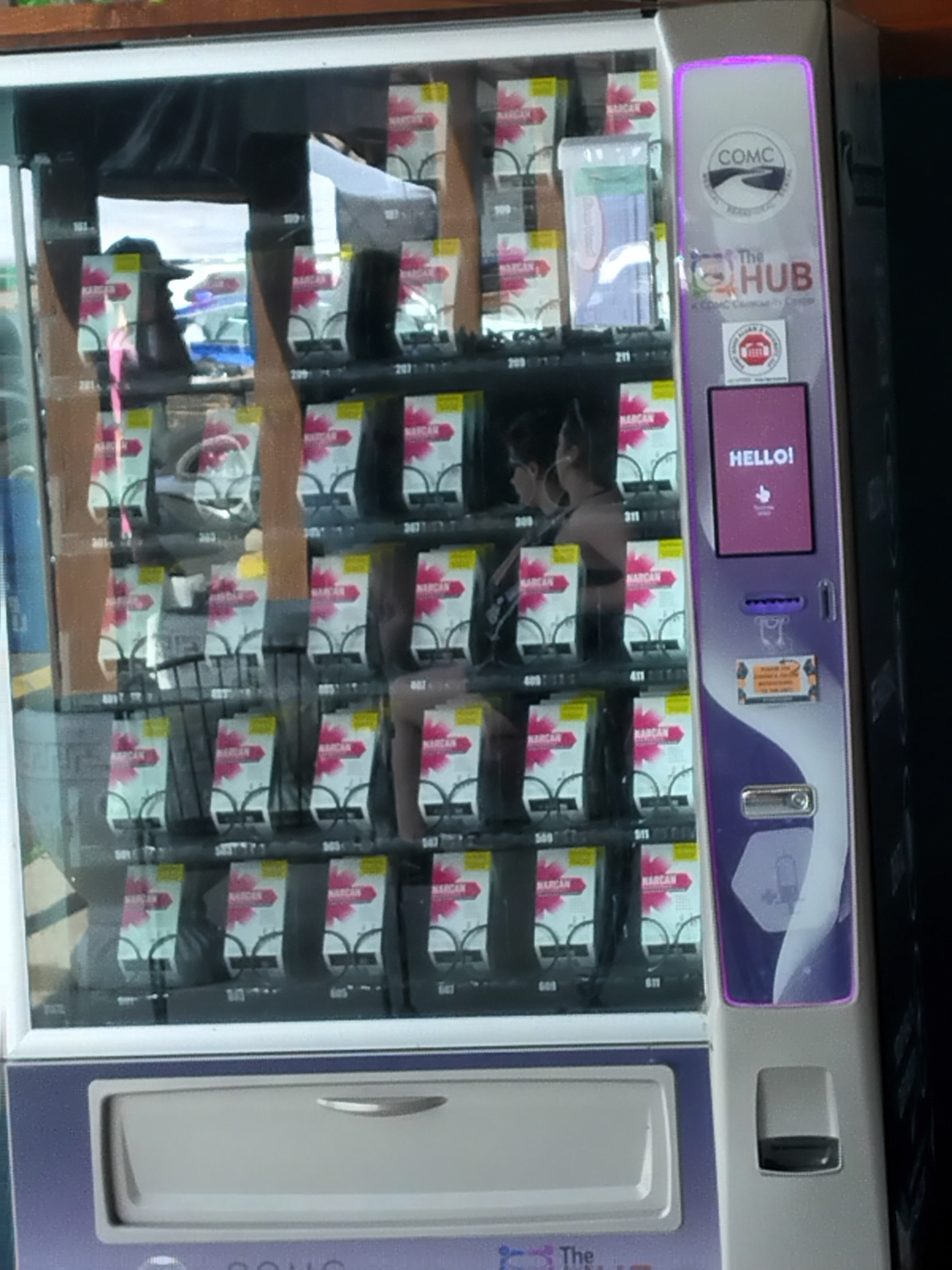
A vending machine dispensing free Narcan in Lake Ozark, Missouri, 2024

Naloxone (Narcan) can be used as a rescue medication for opioid overdose or as a preventive measure for those wanting to stop using opiates. It is an opioid antagonist, meaning it binds to opioid receptors, which prevents them from being activated by opiates. It binds more strongly than other drugs, so that when someone is overdosing on opioids, naloxone can be administered, allowing it to take the place of the opioid drug in the person's receptors, turning them off. This blocks the effect of the receptors.

Take-home naloxone overdose prevention kits have shown promise in areas exhibiting rapid increases in opioid overdoses and deaths due to the increased availability of fentanyl and other synthetic opioids. Many counties offer naloxone training programs with the aim of educating the surrounding community on how to use naloxone. Early implementation of programs that widely distribute THN kits across these areas can substantially reduce the number of opioid overdose deaths. Additionally, persons at risk for opioid overdose did not engage in riskier, compensatory drug use as a result of having access to naloxone kits.

Beginning in Spring 2023 in Illinois, vending machines filled with free naloxone have been placed in high-density areas to prevents opioid overdose deaths.

==== Overdose prevention centers ====
Despite the illegality of injecting illicit drugs in most places around the world, many injectable drug users a report willingness to utilize overdose prevention centers. Those at especially high risk for overdose were significantly more willing. This observed willingness suggests that safe injection sites would be best utilized by people who could benefit most from them.

As of 2018, legislation in the US did not allow for the opening of overdose prevention centers; there were no government-sponsored sites but several efforts were underway to try to create them.

Critics of overdose prevention centers say they enable and exacerbate drug use. Data from 2014 suggested that safe injection sites could reduce overdoses while not increasing the number of drug users.

==== Needle exchange programs ====
The CDC defines needle exchange programs (NEP), also known as syringe services programs, as "community-based programs that provide access to sterile needles and syringes free of cost and facilitate safe disposal of used needles and syringes". NEP were first established in the US in the late 1980s as a response to the HIV pandemic. Because federal funding has long been banned from being used for NEP, their prominence in the US has been minimal. However, in early 2016, in the face of the ever-increasing heroin crisis, Congress effectively rolled back those regulations and is now allowing federal funding to support certain aspects of NEP. NEP are cited by the CDC as a vital aspect of the multi-faceted approach to the opioid crisis.

While opposition to NEP includes fears of increased drug use, studies have shown that they do not increase drug use among users or within a community. NEP have also been known to increase admittance into addiction treatment centers, offer counseling, housing support and help users begin the path to recovery through outreach from trusted staff. In addition, NEP that operate on a one-for-one basis help to drastically reduce the amount of discarded needles in public. Both the Centers for Disease Control and National Institute of Health support the idea that NEP are a crucial aspect to a comprehensive approach to the opioid crisis.

==== Use of blue lights ====
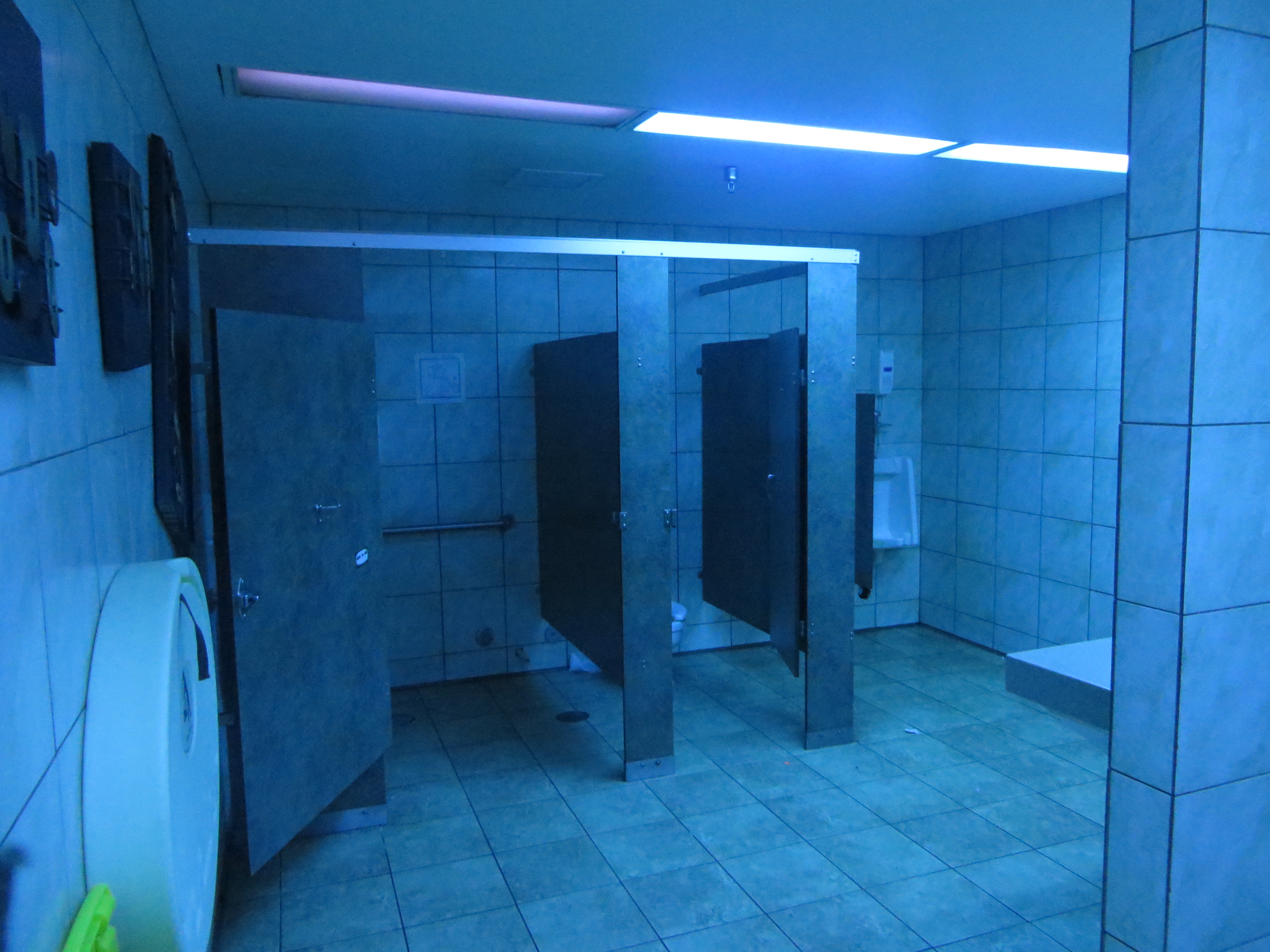
A public bathroom illuminated with blue lights to deter the use of drugs, supposedly making it harder to find veins

As of 2018, some retailers had begun experimenting with the use of blue light bulbs in bathrooms in order to deter addicts from using such spaces to inject opiates. Blue lights are said to make finding veins to inject more difficult. However, a 2013 study has found that the use of blue lights are unlikely to deter drugs users from injecting in public washrooms and may increase drug use-related harm.

=== Pill mill ===
A "pill mill" is a clinic that dispenses narcotics to patients without a legitimate medical purpose. This is done at clinics and doctors' offices, where doctors examine patients extremely quickly with a purpose of prescribing painkillers. These clinics often charge an office fee of $200 to $400 and can see up to 60 patients a day, which is very profitable for the clinic. Pill mills are also large suppliers of the illegal painkiller black markets on the streets. Dealers may hire people to go to pill mills to get painkiller prescriptions.

There have been attempts to shut down pill mills. 250 pill mills in Florida were shut down in 2015. Since the implementation of pill mill laws and drug monitoring programs in Florida, high-risk patients (defined as those who use both benzodiazepines and opioids, those who have been using high opioid doses for extended periods of time, or "opioid shoppers" that obtain their opioid painkillers from multiple sources) have shown significant reductions in opioid use.

=== Trafficking ===
As the number of opioid prescriptions rose, drug cartels began flooding the US with heroin from Mexico. For many opioid users, heroin was cheaper, more potent, and often easier to acquire than prescription medications. According to the CDC, tighter prescription policies by doctors did not necessarily lead to this increased heroin use. The main suppliers of heroin to the US have been Mexican transnational criminal organizations.

From 2005 to 2009, Mexican heroin production increased by over 600%, from an estimated 8 metric tons in 2005 to 50 metric tons in 2009. Between 2010 and 2014, the amount seized at the border more than doubled. According to the Drug Enforcement Administration, smugglers and distributors "profit primarily by putting drugs on the street and have become crucial to the Mexican cartels."

Illicit fentanyl is commonly made in Mexico and trafficked by cartels. North America's dominant trafficking group is Mexico's Sinaloa Cartel, which has been linked to 80 percent of the fentanyl seized in New York.

== In popular culture ==
The widespread impact of the opioid crisis in the United States has led to multiple books, documentaries, and films on the subject.

=== Books ===
In 2003, Pain Killer: An Empire of Deceit and the Origin of America's Opioid Epidemic by the journalist Barry Meier was published. In 2023, Netflix adapted the book into the drama miniseries Painkiller.

In 2015, Dreamland: The True Tale of America's Opiate Epidemic by Sam Quinones was released, which connected the growth of the U.S. opioid epidemic to the production and distribution of black-tar heroin from Mexico.

In 2018, Dopesick: Dealers, Doctors, and the Drug Company that Addicted America by Beth Macy was released. The book covered the origin and evolution of the opioid epidemic in the United States beginning primarily with the 1996 release of the drug OxyContin, examining on its effects on small town America and the Appalachian region in particular. It received the Los Angeles Times Book Prize for Science and Technology. In 2021, Hulu adapted the book into a drama miniseries, also titled Dopesick, starring Michael Keaton.

In 2021, Empire of Pain: The Secret History of the Sackler Dynasty by Patrick Radden Keefe was published, examining the history of the Sackler family, including the founding of Purdue Pharma, its role in the marketing of pharmaceuticals, and the family's central role in the opioid epidemic. The book followed Keefe's 2017 article on the Sackler family in The New Yorker, titled "The Family That Built an Empire of Pain". The book received multiple awards and was longlisted for the 2022 Andrew Carnegie Medal for Excellence in Nonfiction. In 2023, Netflix adapted Keefe's article and Meier's book into the drama miniseries Painkiller.

=== Documentaries ===
The 2013 documentary Oxyana covers prescription drug abuse in rural Southern West Virginia, based in the town of Oceana and surrounding Wyoming County, specifically highlight the abuse of oxycodone.

In 2017, the short documentary film Heroin(e) was released and nominated for the Academy Award for Best Documentary Short Subject at the 90th Academy Awards. The film focuses on the opioid epidemic's effects on Huntington, West Virginia, where the overdose rate was 10 times the US average.

In 2020, Netflix released the documentary series The Pharmacist, which covers the efforts of Dan Schneider, a small-town pharmacist in Poydras, Louisiana, to identify his son's killer and his gathering of evidence against a prolific "pill mill" doctor in New Orleans, leading to an investigation against Purdue Pharma's aggressive corporate sales tactics of OxyContin.

In 2021, HBO released The Crime of the Century, a 2-part documentary directed by Alex Gibney that follows the opioid epidemic and the political operatives, government regulations and corporations that enable the abuse of opioids, particularly the Sackler family and Purdue Pharma, and received positive reviews."

All the Beauty and the Bloodshed is a 2022 documentary about the activist Nan Goldin's fight against the Sackler family for their role in the opioid epidemic in the United States.. At the 95th Academy Awards, the film was nominated for Best Documentary Feature and was awarded a Peabody Award at the 84th ceremony in 2023.

== See also ==
- China and the opioid epidemic in the United States
- Diseases of despair – including opioid overdose
- List of countries by prevalence of opiates use
- List of deaths from drug overdose and intoxication
- Opium in Iran, world's highest per capita rate of opiate addiction
- Response to the Opioid Crisis in New Jersey
- United States drug overdose death rates and totals over time
- United States sanctions against China
