= Executive Order 14367 =

- Long title: Designating Fentanyl as a Weapon of Mass Destruction

Legislative history
- Signed into law by President Donald Trump on December 15, 2025

Executive Order 14367, titled Designating Fentanyl as a Weapon of Mass Destruction, is an executive order signed by President Donald Trump on January 5, 2026.

== Background ==
The order was issued in the context of escalating U.S. policy responses to fentanyl trafficking, with the administration framing the synthetic opioid crisis as both a public health emergency and a national security threat, and seeking to expand the use of military and intelligence tools against drug networks. The administration also cited the lethality of fentanyl and its links to organised criminal networks as justification for applying national security and weapons-related authorities to address the crisis. According to a New York Times article, legal experts questioned aspects of the administration’s broader approach, including claims that drug trafficking constituted an “armed conflict,” noting that the legal standards for such a designation were not met.
