= List of things named after the Sackler family =

The Sackler family has donated to numerous cultural institutions and universities, which named different things after the family. Following public revelations of the Sacklers' involvement in the opioid epidemic, groups such as P.A.I.N. began lobbying for the removal of the Sackler name. As part of the bankruptcy settlement for Purdue Pharma, which was owned by the Sackler family, they allowed institutions to remove their name from scholarships and buildings.

== United States ==
- The American Museum of Natural History contained the Sackler Educational Laboratory and Sackler Institute for Comparative Genomics. Both have since removed the Sackler name.
- In 2016, the Dia Art Foundation created the Sackler Institute, but removed the name in 2019.
- The Solomon R. Guggenheim Museum formerly contained the Sackler Center for Arts Education, removing the family's name in 2022. The museum had previously decided in 2019 that it would no longer accept donations from the Sacklers; they had donated $9 million from 1995 to 2015.
- The Metropolitan Museum of Art had a Sackler Wing that contained the Temple of Dendur; the name was removed in 2021.
- Tufts University removed the family's name from the Sackler School of Graduate Biomedical Sciences, the Arthur M. Sackler Center for Medical Education, the Sackler Laboratory for the Convergence of Biomedical, Physical and Engineering Sciences, the Sackler Families Fund for Collaborative Cancer Biology Research, and the Richard S. Sackler, M.D. Endowed Research Fund in 2019. Earlier that year, the Massachusetts Attorney General had argued that Purdue Pharma promoted OxyContin using its connections to Tufts.
- Yale University had a Sackler Institute for Biological, Physical and Engineering Sciences and two professorships endowed by the family: the David A. Sackler Professor of Pharmacology and the Richard Sackler and Jonathan Sackler Professorship in Internal Medicine. The university stopped accepting donations from the Sacklers in 2019 and began fully severing ties with the Sacklers in 2021.
- NYU Langone Health had a Sackler Institute of Graduate Biomedical Sciences. The institute ceased accepting donations from the family in 2019. Named after the family since its founding in 1980, it has since been renamed the Vilcek Institute of Graduate Biomedical Sciences.
- Harvard University has two buildings named after Arthur Sackler: The Sackler Building which is used by the Faculty of Arts and Sciences, and The Arthur M. Sackler Museum, which is one of three art museums on Harvard's campus. Harvard students have protested to have the Sackler name removed, citing the link between his family's involvement in the opioid crisis. Harvard has kept the use of the Sackler name and has not returned any of the family's donations because, according to President Lawrence S. Bacow, of "legal and contractual obligations." Bacow also justified the naming by stating that the buildings were named after Arthur Sackler, who died before Oxycontin was introduced
- In 2024, the National Academy of Sciences petitioned the Superior Court in Washington DC to be allowed to repurpose about $30 million in endowment funds named for the Sackler family—donations which had begun in 2008.
- The Arthur M. Sackler Gallery at the Smithsonian Institution in Washington, D.C. has not been renamed.

== United Kingdom ==
Dedication	Organisation	Location	Status	References
Sackler Galleries	Ashmolean Museum	Oxford	Name removed in 2023	
Sackler Keeper of Antiquities	Ashmolean Museum	Oxford	Name removed in 2023	
Sackler Learning Officer	Ashmolean Museum	Oxford	Name removed in 2023	
Raymond & Beverly Sackler Galleries of the Ancient Levant	British Museum	London	Name removed in 2022	
Sackler Library	City and Guilds of London Art School	London	Name removed by 2023	
Sackler Library	Design Museum	London	Name removed in 2022	
Sackler Director	Dulwich Picture Gallery	London	Name removed in 2022	
Sackler Centre for Arts Education	Dulwich Picture Gallery	London	Presumed renamed (Note: Although the Gallery did not make a formal announcement of any name change, the former Sackler Centre was opened in 2000, matching the description of the 'Art Studio' on the Gallery's website.)	
Sackler Garden	Garden Museum	London	Renamed 'Courtyard Garden'	
Sackler Crossing	Kew Gardens	London	Name removed in 2022	
Sackler Institute for Translational Neurodevelopment	King's College London	London	Name removed in 2023	
Sackler Study Room	London Library	London	Name removed in 2022	
Sackler Hall	Museum of London	London	Presumed closed (Note: The Museum of London closed in December 2022 in order to relocate to Smithfield Market for 2026.)	
Sackler Room	National Gallery	London	Name removed in 2022	
Sackler Pavilion	National Theatre	London	In use	
Sackler Biodiversity Imaging Laboratory	Natural History Museum	London	In use	
Sackler Gallery	Old Royal Naval College	London	Unclear (Note: Although the Old Royal Naval College has not made any formal announcement about the gallery, reference to it was removed from the College's website by November 2020.)	
Sackler Space	The Roundhouse	London	In use	
Sackler Building	Royal College of Art	London	Renamed 'Painting Building' in 2022	
Sackler Trust Trainee Scheme	Royal Court Theatre	London	Scheme suspended in 2019	
Serpentine Sackler Gallery	Serpentine Gallery	London	Renamed 'Serpentine North Gallery' in 2021	
Sackler Studios	Shakespeare's Globe	London	Name removed in 2022	
Sackler Octagon Gallery	Tate Britain	London	Name removed	
Sackler Escalator	Tate Modern	London	Name removed in 2022 (Note: In 2019, the Tate said it would not take any further Sackler donations, but that the family's name would not be removed from existing gifts. In February 2022, Tate announced that the name would be removed.)	
Sackler Staircase	Theatre Royal	Glasgow	Name removed in 2022	
Institute for Medical Research Sackler Lecture Theatre	University of Cambridge	Cambridge	Name removed 2022	
Institute of Astronomy Sackler Lecture Theatre	University of Cambridge	Cambridge	Presumed removed (Note: As of 2023, the Institute of Astronomy website referred to the lecture theatre simply as the 'Hoyle Building Lecture Theatre'.)	
Raymond and Beverley Sackler Distinguished Lecture in Archaeology	University of Cambridge	Cambridge	In use	
Sackler Chair of the UCL Institute of Mental Health	University College London	London	In use	
Sackler Library	University of Oxford	Oxford	Renamed 'Bodleian Art, Archaeology and Ancient World Library' in 2023	
Sackler-Clarendon Associate Professor of Sedimentary Geology	University of Oxford Department of Earth Sciences	Oxford	Name removed in 2023	
Sackler Centre for Consciousness Science	University of Sussex	Sussex	Renamed 'Sussex Centre for Consciousness Science' in 2022	
Sackler Courtyard	Victoria & Albert Museum	London	Name removed in 2022	
Sackler Centre for Arts Education	Victoria & Albert Museum	London	Name removed in 2022	
Sackler Trust plaque	V&A Dundee	Dundee	Plaque removed in 2023	
Sackler windows	Westminster Abbey	London	In use	

In 2023, Royal Museums Greenwich said they would remove Theresa Sackler's name from their list of 'major supporters'.

== France ==
In July 2019 the Louvre removed the Sackler name from a wing of 12 rooms that contained eastern antiquities. The Louvre issued a statement that the museum had a policy of only naming rooms for 20 years and given that the Sackler donation had been made in 1996 and 1997, the naming period was over. The removal followed a protest led by Nan Goldin at the beginning of the month.

== Germany ==
Following a donation in 2002, the Jewish Museum Berlin named the Sackler Staircase after the family. In April 2019, the museum announced it would decline any new donations from the family, though it would not rename the staircase nor return the initial donation.

== China ==
- Peking University has a museum of art and Chinese archeology named after Arthur Sackler.

== Israel ==
- Raymond & Beverly Sackler School of Physics & Astronomy - Tel Aviv University's School of Physics & Astronomy is named after Raymond & Beverly Sackler.
- The medical school of Tel Aviv University was named the Sackler Faculty of Medicine until 2024.
