= Sackler Wing =

Part of New York City's Metropolitan Museum of Art

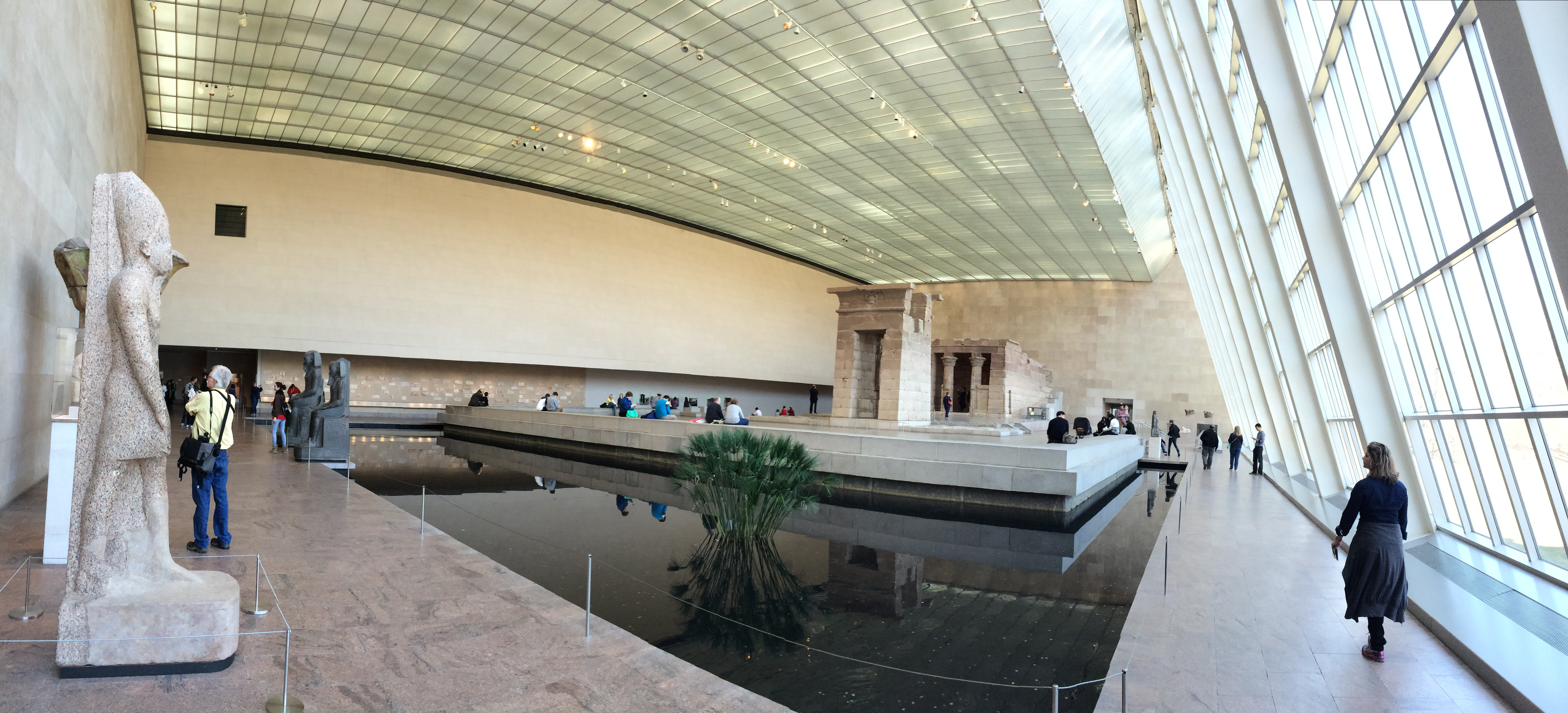
- Interactive map of Sackler Wing

General information
- Location: Metropolitan Museum of Art, New York City
- Inaugurated: 1978

Design and construction
- Architect: Kevin Roche
- Architecture firm: Roche-Dinkeloo

The Sackler Wing was built in 1978 at The Met Fifth Avenue, the Metropolitan Museum of Art's flagship location in New York City. Designed by Kevin Roche and located to the north of the museum's original building, the wing was built to house the Temple of Dendur, brought from Egypt to New York.

The wing was named after the Sackler family, which is associated with the Purdue Pharma company accused of fueling the opioid crisis in the US. In 2021 the name Sackler was removed from several elements of the Met Museum, but no substitute name for this wing was proposed. Maps of the Met Museum show in 2023 no name for this particular wing, while the related one situated at the south side, the Michael C. Rockefeller Wing, remains well identified. The space within the Wing housing the temple is just Gallery 131.

== History ==
The addition of the wing was part of a comprehensive architectural renewal plan for the Museum by then director of the Met, Thomas Hoving. Several additions were planned, with different donors, but in order to house the Egyptian temple of Dendur, Hoving calculated that $3.5 million was needed. Arthur Sackler volunteered that amount in 1967. In the negotiations that followed, names for several galleries and wings were assigned to the Sacklers, with personal mentions of the brothers Arthur, Mortimer and Raymond, each mentioned with the letters "M.D." following his name in every signage associated. It was also stipulated that the money would come personally from the three doctors. However, the payment of the donation was to be paid over twenty years, and the city "ended up chipping in $1.4 million", according to journalist Patrick Radden Keefe in his book Empire of Pain.

The plan was approved in 1971. The Sackler Wing was complete by the end of 1978, and the rest in 1991; all the work was directed by Roche's architectural firm, Kevin Roche John Dinkeloo and Associates. The launch of a new exhibit was prepared for opening of the Wing, The Treasures of King Tut, showing objects from the tomb of Tutankhamun. A show by choreographer Martha Graham was also commissioned for the opening by the Sacklers.

Another element of the extension was the Michael C. Rockefeller Wing, with the Andre Meyer Galleries above, which was added to the south. The adjacent corners were completed by the respective additions of the new American Wing and the Wallace Galleries for Twentieth Century Art.

When Kevin Roche died in 2019, The Sackler Wing was praised as one of his most notable achievements. Roche was a recipient of the Pritzker Architecture Prize, and it is customary that the presentation ceremonies of this prize pay homage to works done by previous laureates of the prize; following this tradition, the ceremony for laureate Ieoh Ming Pei in 1983 took place in the Sackler Wing.

The Sackler Wing hosted, until the name was dropped in 2021, several galleries also named after the Sackler family: The Sackler Wing Galleries (galleries 223–232), The Temple of Dendur in The Sackler Wing (Gallery 131) and The Sackler Gallery for Egyptian Art (Gallery 130).

In March 2018, the artist Nan Goldin and around 100 fellow activists of the PAIN group, threw pill bottles into the moat that is in the Wing, to protest sponsorship by the family that owned Purdue Pharma, producer and marketer of the opioid Oxycontin, associated to the opioid epidemic. PAIN's campaign, which continued in other art institutions associated to the Sackler name, was finally successful: The Met announced in May 2019, that it would reject further contributions from the Sacklers; and in 2021, finally, the name was also dropped in a decision mutually agreed among the Museum and the descendants of Mortimer Sackler and Raymond Sackler. No substitute name for the wing has been proposed.

== Gallery ==
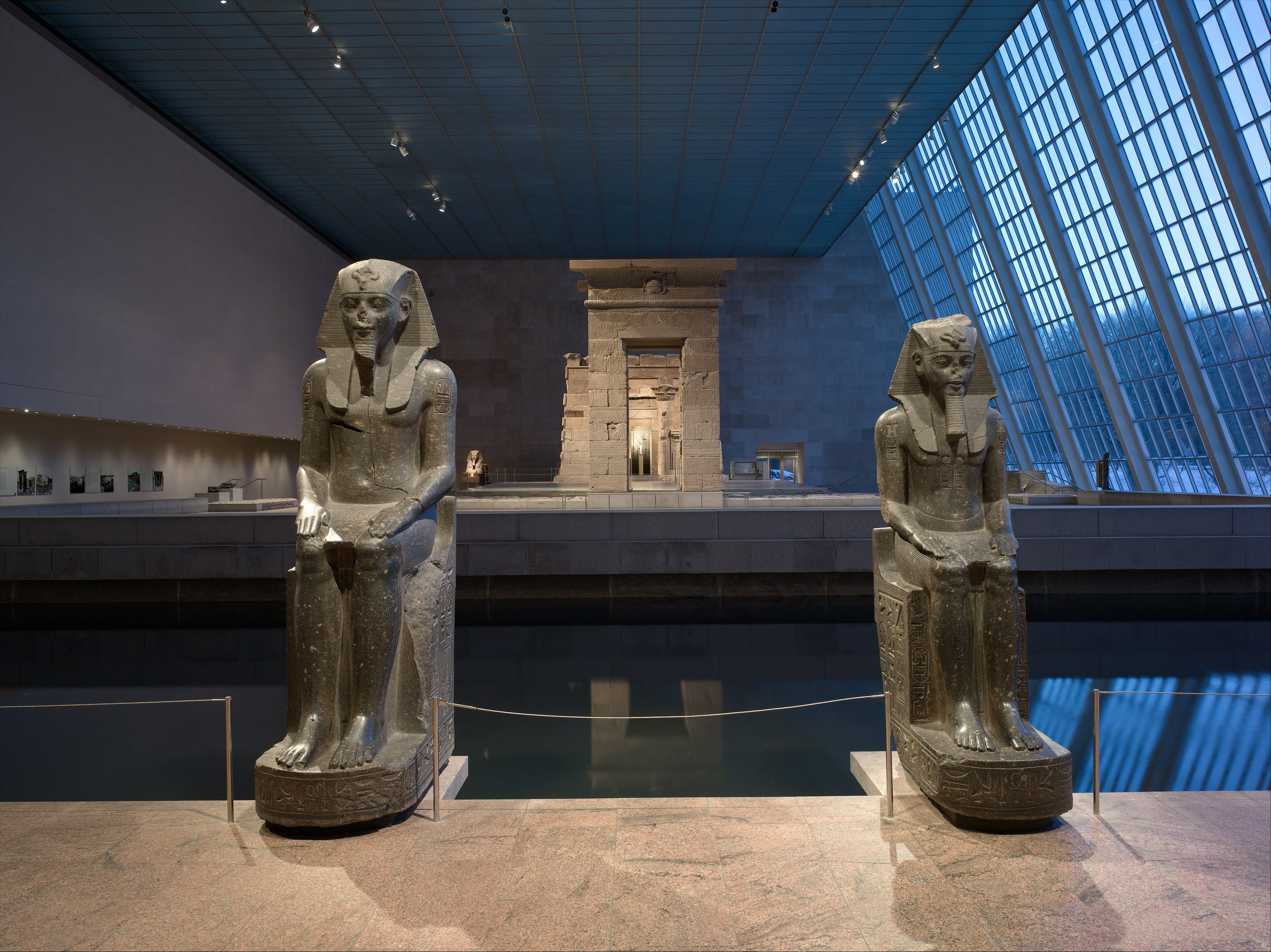
The Temple of Dendur and Egyptian sculptures hosted in Gallery 131.

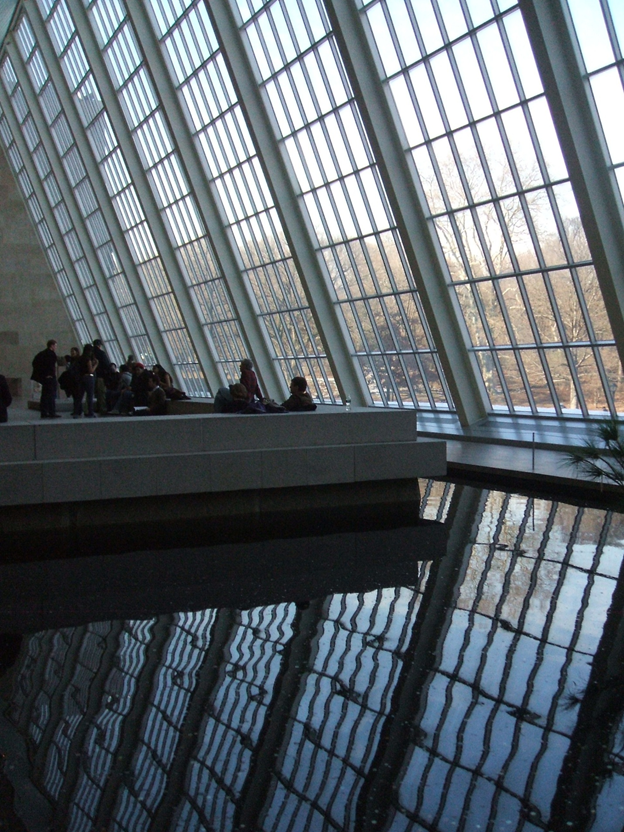
Detail of the moat and windows.

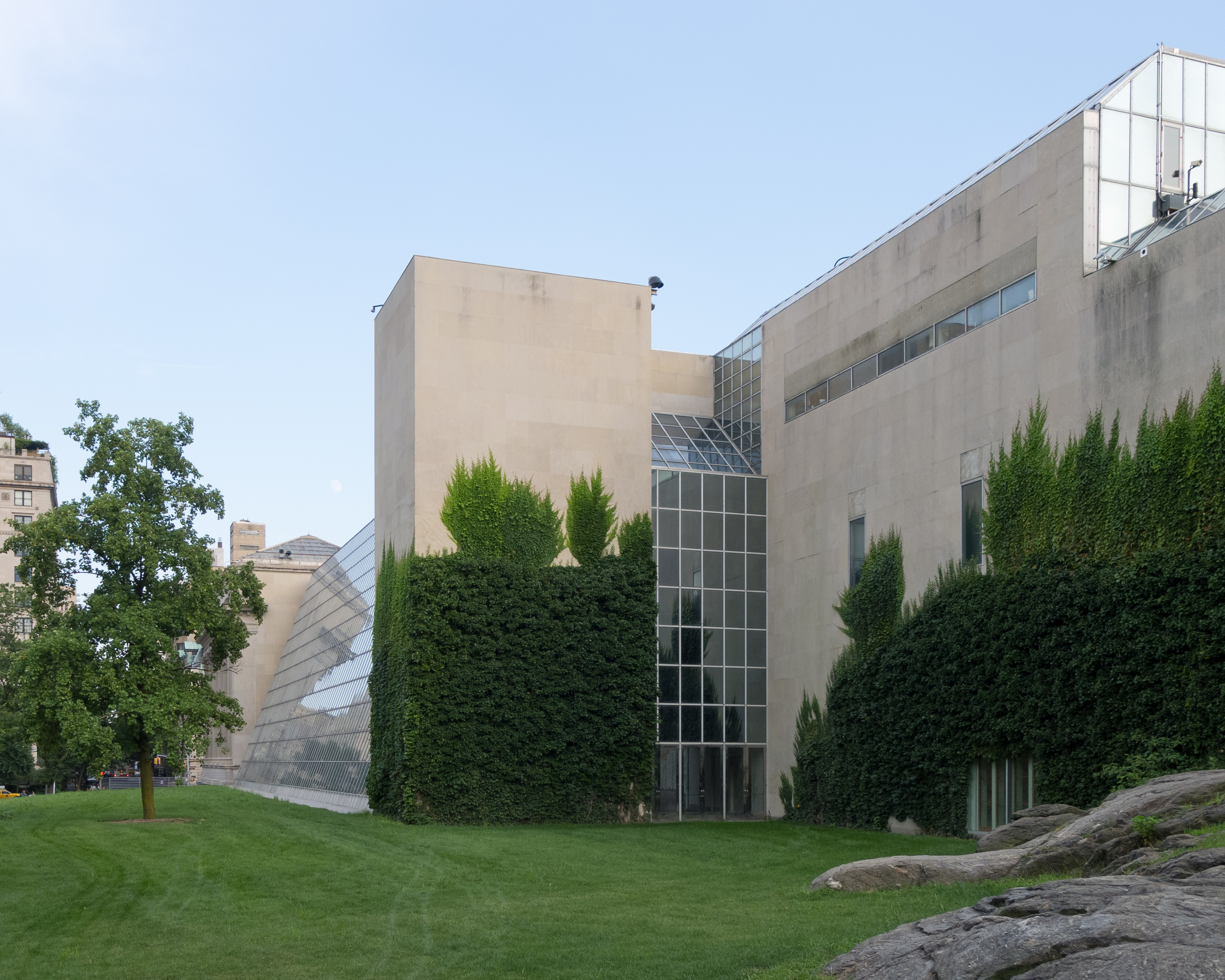
Exterior view of the Wing.

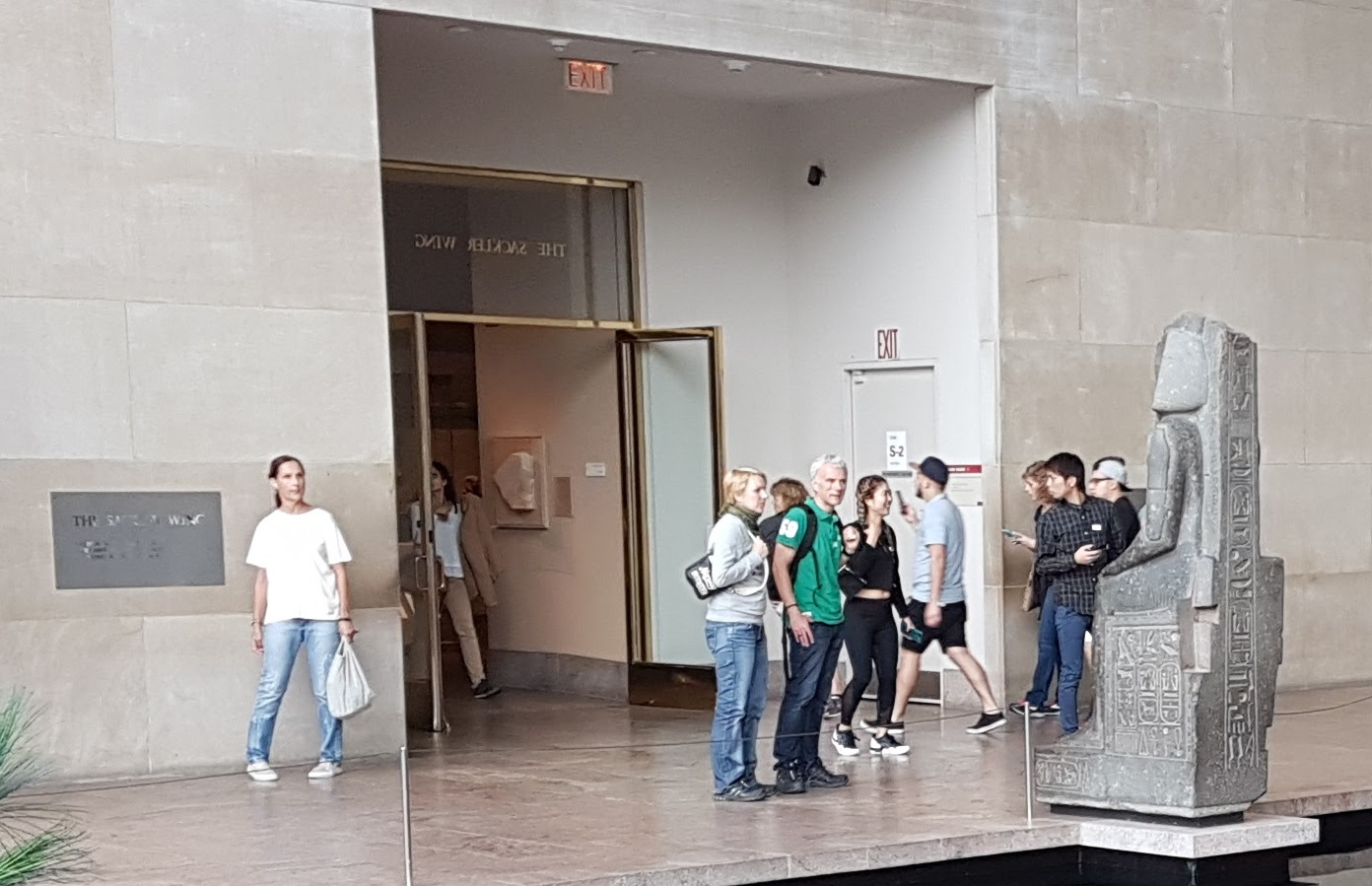
The Sacker Wing name visible at the entrance, in 2017.
