= Exhibition Road Courtyard =

Part of the Victoria and Albert Museum

Coordinates: 51.4969°N 0.1733°W

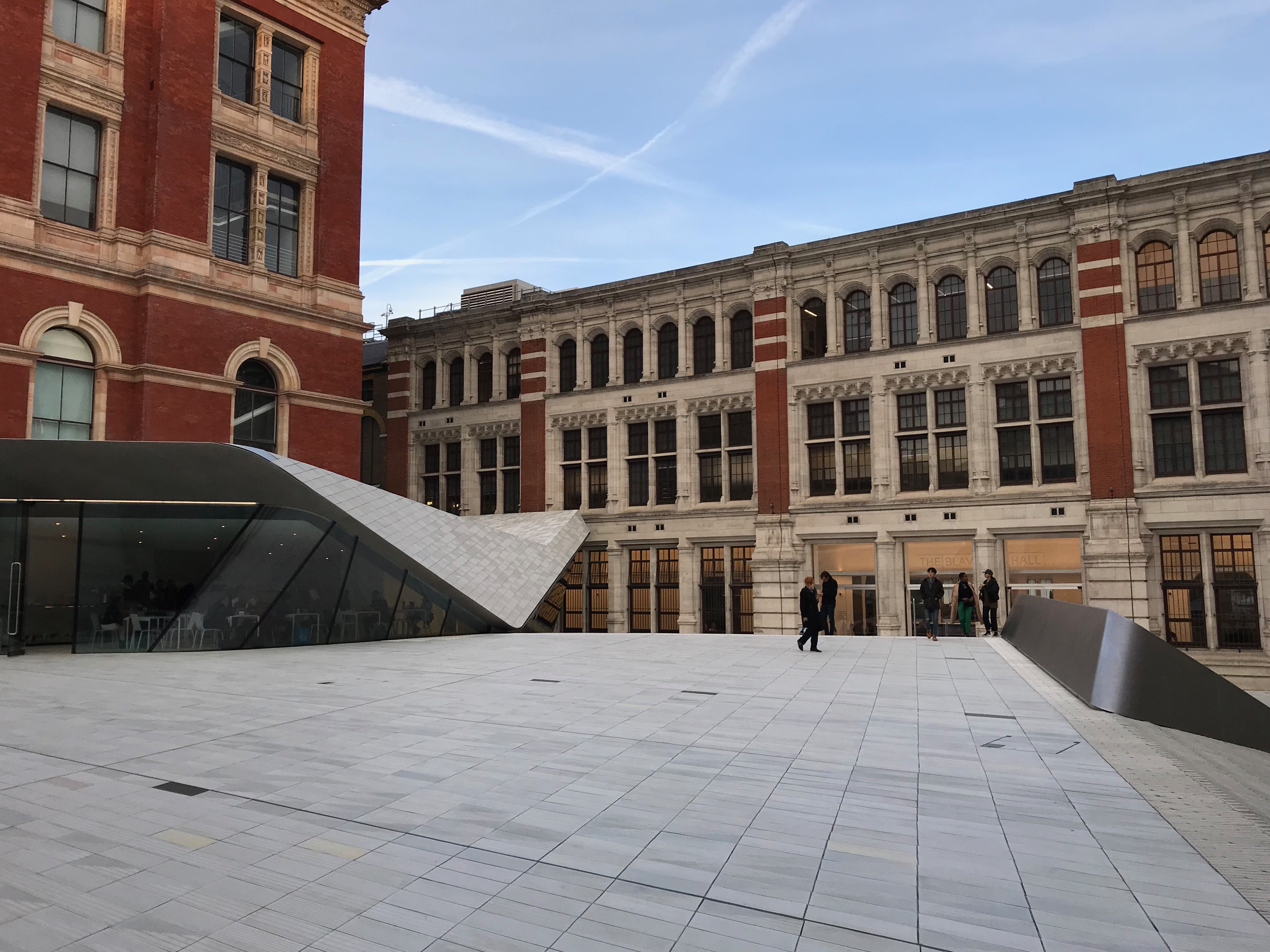
- Interactive map of the Exhibition Road Courtyard area
- Former names: Sackler Courtyard

General information
- Location: Victoria and Albert Museum, London
- Inaugurated: 2017

Technical details
- Material: porcelain tiles
- Floor area: 1200 m2

Design and construction
- Architect: Amanda Levete

The Exhibition Road Courtyard (named as Sackler Courtyard between 2017 and 2022) is a public courtyard that serves as an entrance to the Victoria & Albert Museum in London. It is part of the V&A Exhibition Road Quarter entrance and expansion of the museum, completed in 2017 and designed by architectural practice AL_A, the firm of architect Amanda Levete.

The courtyard opens out onto the street (Exhibition Road) through a perforated entrance gate. It is made of 11,000 handmade tiles, a reference to the V&A's heritage as a world-leader in ceramic study, collection and preservation. It is the world's first porcelain public courtyard, and special non-slip porcelain tiles had to be created for the project. The courtyard also features a cafe, and an oculus that gives a view down into the new performance hall of the museum below.

== Controversial name ==
The courtyard was named Sackler Courtyard after the Sackler family, associated with the Purdue Pharma company accused of fuelling the opioid crisis in the US. Theresa Sackler, the chair of the Sackler Trust, sat on the V&A's board of trustees at the time the Courtyard was opened.

In 2019 US photographer and activist Nan Goldin and her group P.A.I.N. (Prescription Addiction Intervention Now) held their first anti-Sackler performance protest outside of the United States at this place in London, demanding that the museum “abandon the Sackler name”, remove signage at the institution linked to the family and stop receiving donations. Goldin led a group of 30 demonstrators in placing bottles of pills and red-stained “Oxy dollar” bills on the courtyard's tiled floor. At the time, the museum's director Tristram Hunt supported the family and refused to change the name. He told a press conference "we’re proud to have been supported by the Sacklers."

In 2022 the Museum bowed to the pressure and removed the name. No new name was announced at the time for the courtyard, but 2023 maps of the museum show the name Exhibition Road Courtyard in it.

== See also ==
- List of things named after the Sackler family
