= Serpentine North =

Listed building in Hyde Park, London

Coordinates: 51.5071°N 0.1713°W

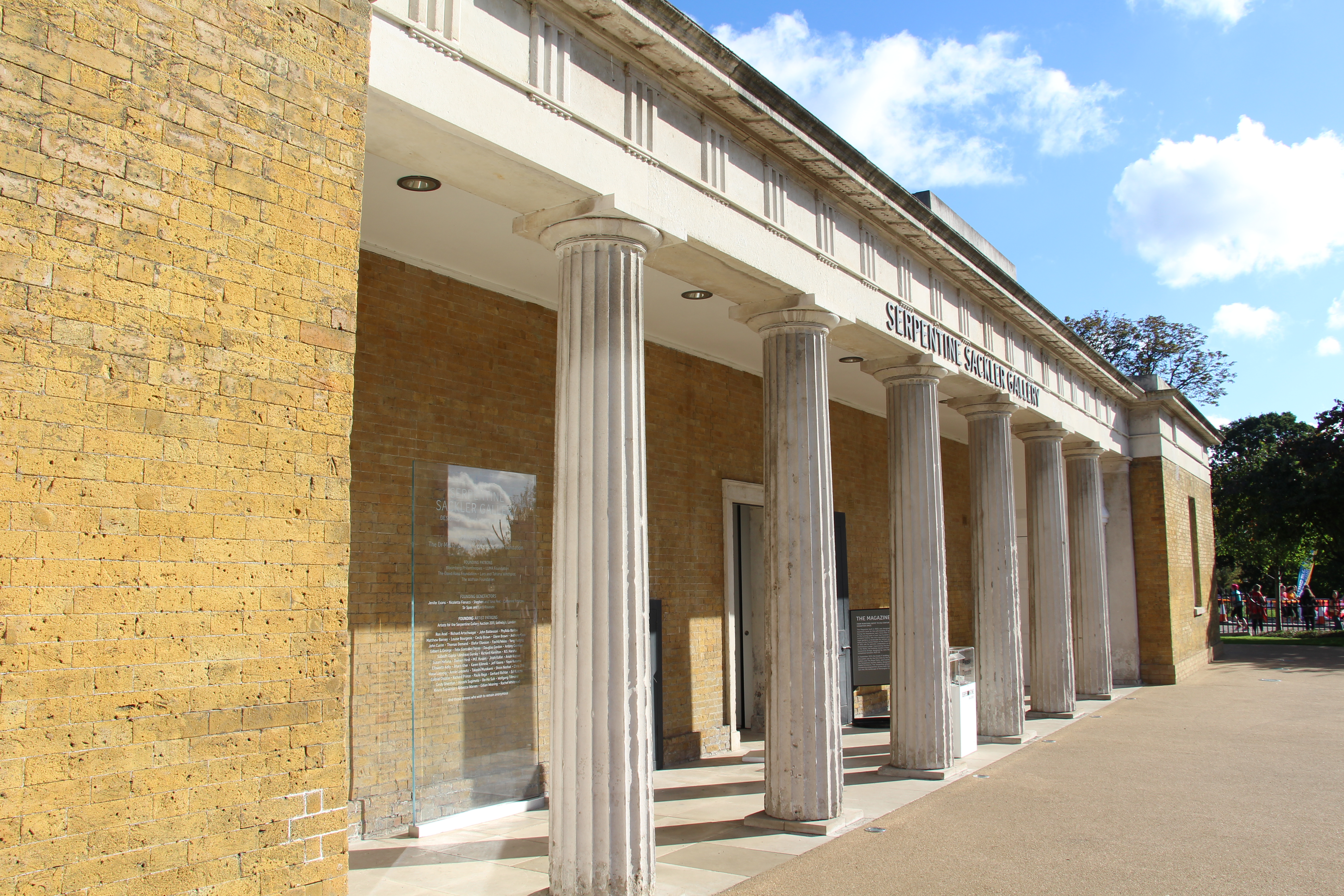
- Interactive map of the Serpentine North area
- Former names: Serpentine Sackler Gallery, The Magazine

General information
- Location: Serpentine Galleries, London

Design and construction
- Architect: Zaha Hadid

Serpentine North, August 2026

Serpentine North or Serpentine North Gallery is a listed building in Hyde Park, London, which, with the South Gallery, constitutes the Serpentine Galleries, an art exposition space. It was originally known as The Magazine, and also, from 2013 to 2021, as the Serpentine Sackler Gallery. Since 2013, the name The Magazine specifically refers to an extension of the building, a restaurant designed by architect Zaha Hadid.

== History ==
Built in 1805, the building was originally a gunpowder magazine. It is listed as a Grade II* building. It was constructed to replace an earlier building which stood to the north-east and was still extant in 1875; it is assumed that both structures were erected by the Board of Ordnance, possibly for the issue of gunpowder on the occasions of drill and reviews in Hyde Park. The original architect is unknown.

The magazine remained in military use as workshops and stores until 1963 when it was transferred to the Ministry of Public Building and Works. From 2010, it was converted into an art gallery, with a renovation project directed by Zaha Hadid, which included the addition of the adjoining restaurant.

Inauguration of the art gallery took place in 2013, with the name Serpentine Sackler Gallery, following a £5.5m donation from a foundation run by Theresa and Mortimer Sackler. The Sackler family, members of which owned Purdue Pharma which is behind the painkiller OxyContin, is widely believed to be one of the causes of the US opioid epidemic. The Sacklers have a history of museum philanthropy, with museums around the world accepting donations and naming buildings, wings, galleries and more after the family. This trend, which begun in the 2nd half of the 20th century and continued until the 2010s, was reversed by campaigns by victims of the opioid epidemic.

In the case of Serpentine North, artist Hito Steyerl opened up an exposition in the site publicly dennouncing the Sacklers. Following Steyerl's remarks, the gallery put out a statement that concluded: “Donations to the Serpentine from the Sackler Trust are historic and we have no future plans to accept funding from the Sacklers.” In spring 2021, the Serpentine announced a name change from Serpentine Sackler Gallery to Serpentine North but the sign in the front of the building displayed the Sackler name until 2022.

== Gallery ==
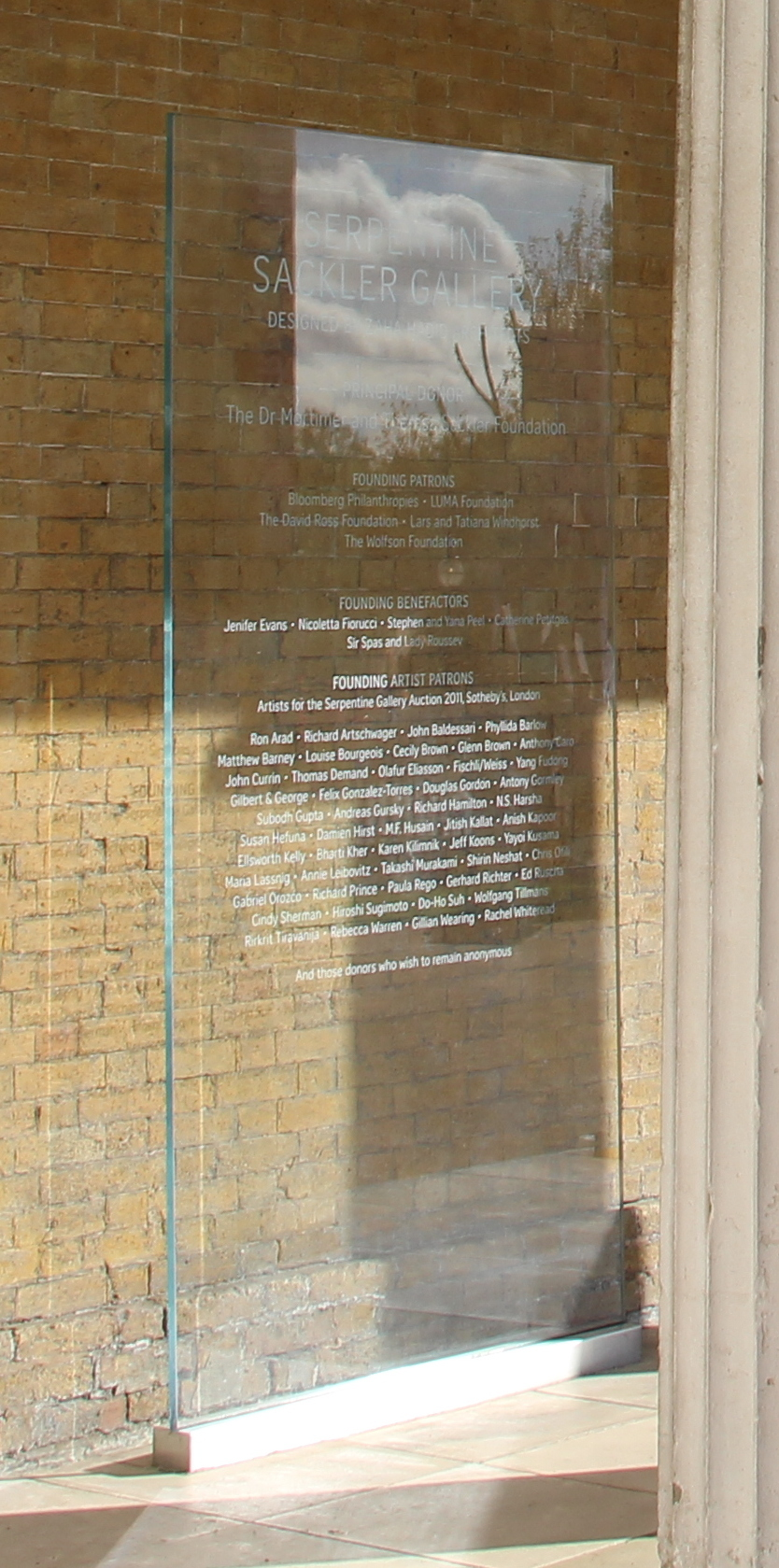
The Sackler's donation noted in 2016.

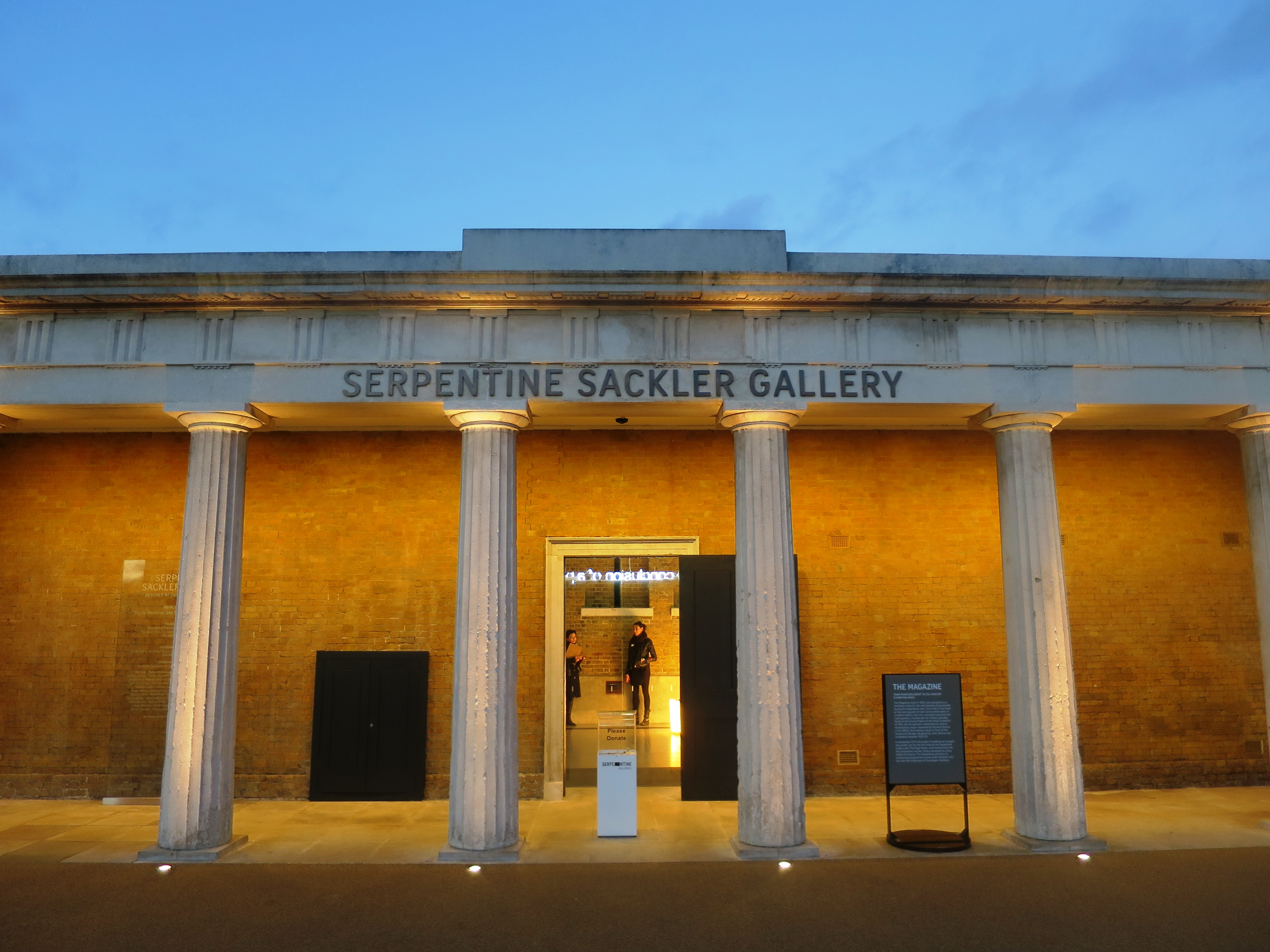
Former name, Serpentine Sackler Gallery.

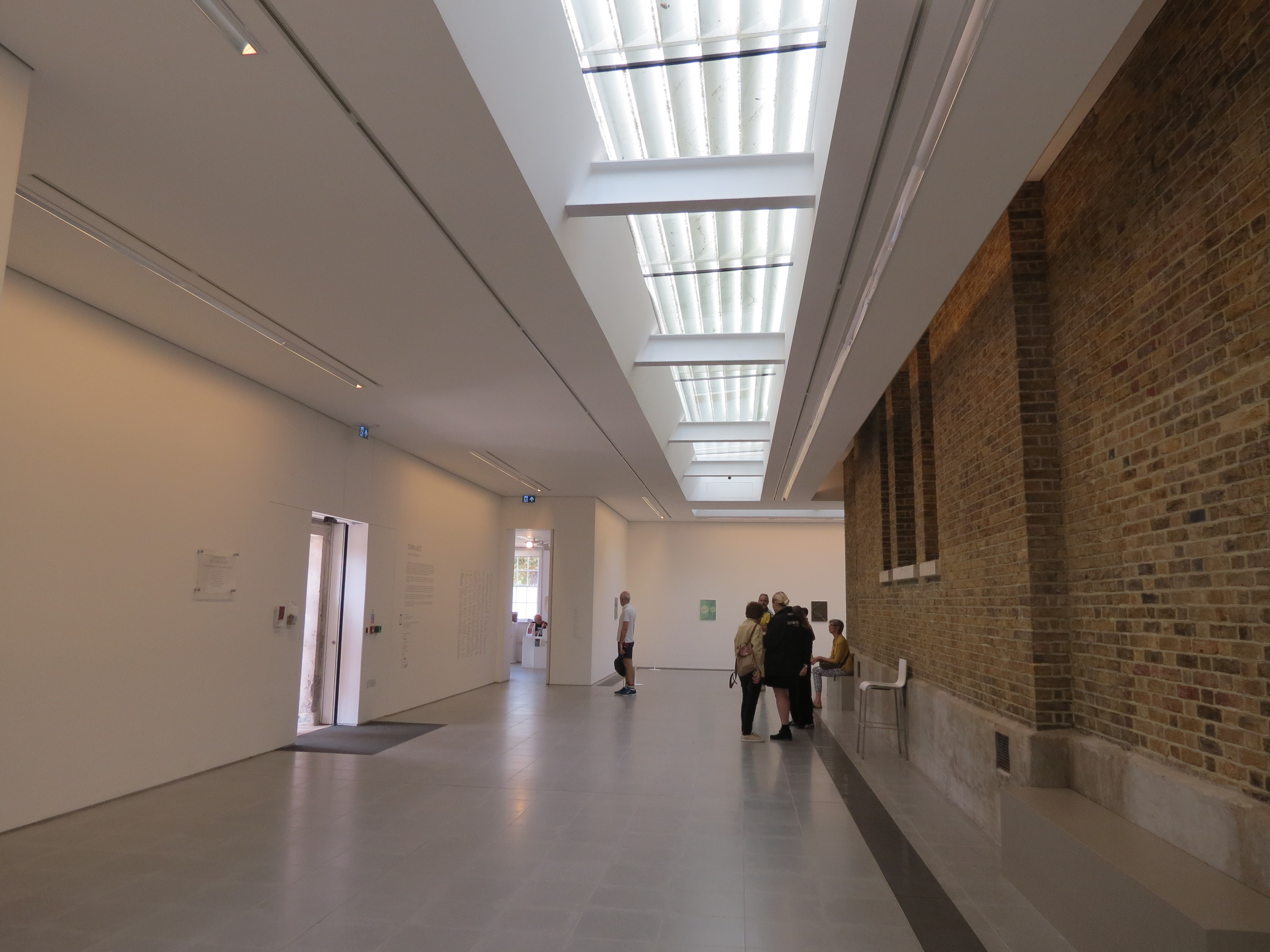
Interior view.

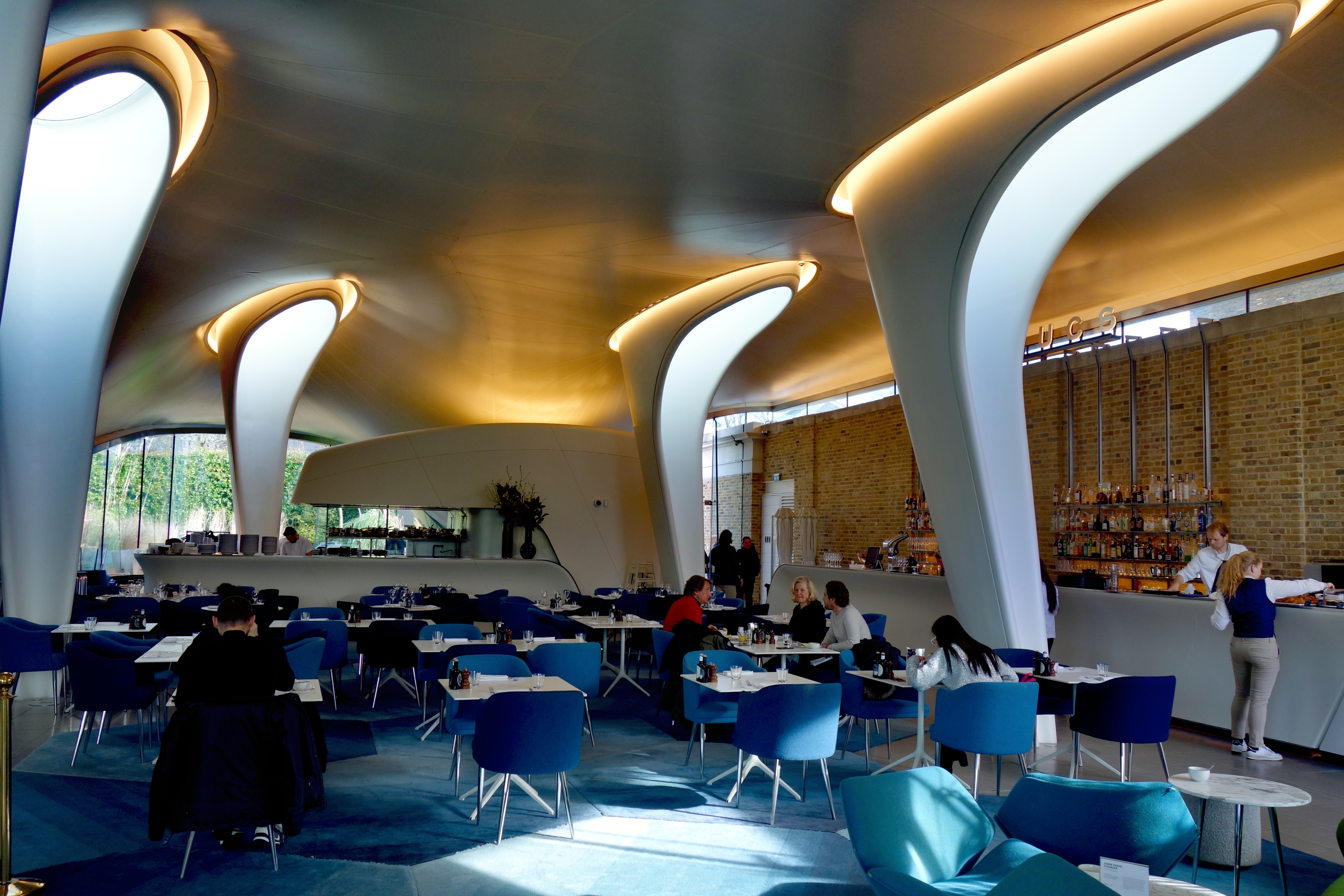
The Magazine restaurant.

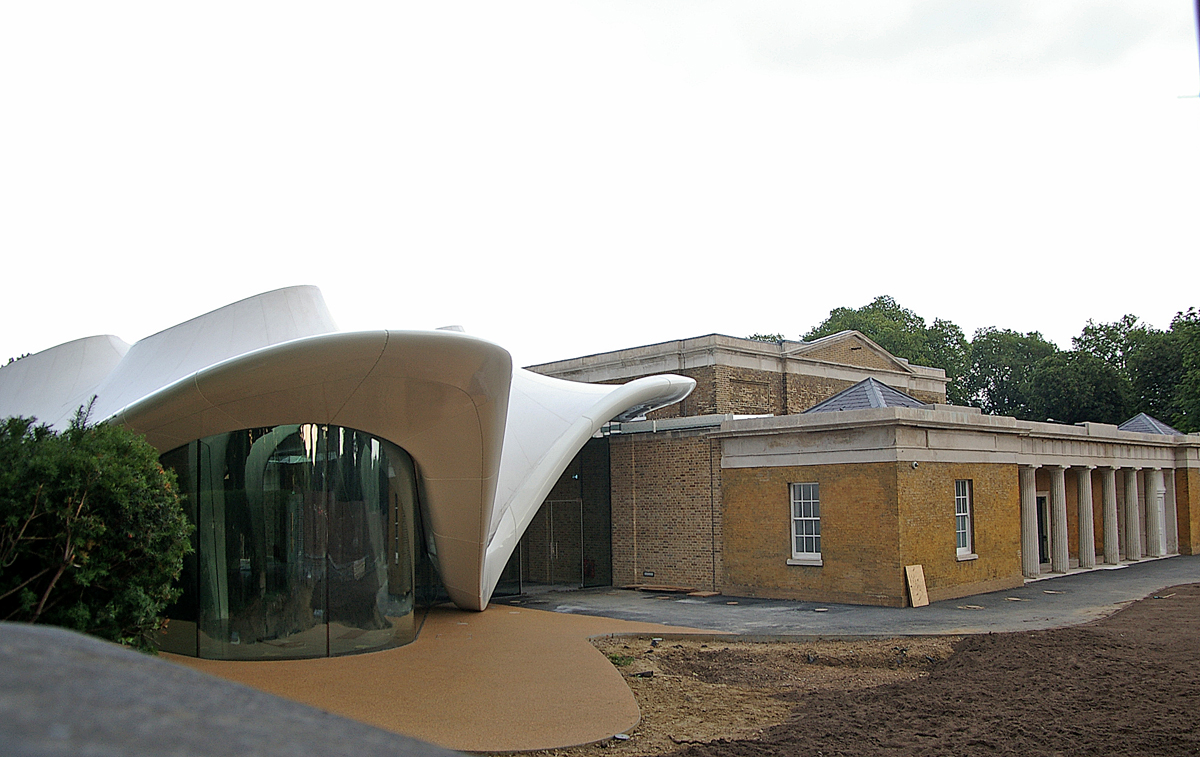
The Magazine, the restaurant extension by Zaha Hadid.

== See also ==
- List of museums in London
- List of things named after the Sackler family
