= P.A.I.N. =

American advocacy organization

P.A.I.N. (Prescription Addiction Intervention Now) is an American advocacy organization founded by artist Nan Goldin to respond to the opioid crisis, specifically targeting the Sackler family for manufacturing, promoting, and distributing the drug Oxycontin through their corporation Purdue Pharma LP.

== History ==
Nan Goldin founded P.A.I.N in 2017 in response to coverage of the opioid epidemic and the Sackler family's involvement in production of Oxycontin in The New Yorker and Esquire, and as a result of her own addiction to Oxycontin. The goal of P.A.I.N.'s advocacy work is to hold the Sackler Family accountable and to demand that they fund opioid addiction treatment programs. They highlight the financial support that Sackler has given to museums and cultural institutions as a mechanism for improving their public image, and ask the corporation to instead fund harm reduction, rehabilitation, and public education projects. P.A.I.N. demonstrates at these museums and cultural institutions to request that they remove the Sackler name from their institutions and refuse future Sackler donations. Goldin and twelve other members of P.A.I.N. were arrested during a 2019 protest against New York State Governor Andrew Cuomo's lack of action on the opioid epidemic, which drew a crowd of approximately two hundred protestors.

== Activism ==
=== Arthur M. Sackler Museum ===
P.A.I.N. joined with activists and medical professionals for a July 2018 protest at Harvard's Arthur M. Sackler Museum in Cambridge (Massachusetts) to highlight the Sackler Family's position as a funder of art institutions, and to call on the Sackler Family to instead use their money to fund opioid addiction treatment programs. Protesters marched from Harvard Square to the Harvard Art Museums, threw empty prescription bottles on the floor, and took part in a "die-in".

On April 20, 2023, at least 50 protesters associated with P.A.I.N. staged another die-in in the atrium of the Harvard Art Museum, promoting continuing efforts to dename Sackler facilities at Harvard. A Harvard spokesman confirmed that Harvard has been "considering" a proposal to remove the Sackler name since October 2022.

=== Guggenheim Museum ===
In February 2019, P.A.I.N. organized a surprise demonstration at the Guggenheim Museum in response to the Sackler Family's support of the museum and its Sackler Center for Arts Education. Drawing inspiration from reports that Richard Sackler had stated, upon the launch of the drug Oxycontin into the market, that "The prescription blizzard will be so deep, dense, and white", protesters dropped fake Oxycontin prescriptions into the museum rotunda before unfurling banners and staging a die-in. Banners including texts such as "400,000 dead" and "Take Down Their Name". Fake Oxycontin prescriptions included excerpts from communication between top Purdue Pharma executives, including members of the Sackler Family, about how to increase sales of the drug despite the likelihood that it would be abused.

=== Metropolitan Museum of Art ===
The Metropolitan Museum of Art was the location of P.A.I.N. protests in 2018 because its largest gallery space is named after the Sacklers. This demonstration included scattering empty prescription bottles around the Temple of Dendur in the Sackler Wing of the museum and staging a die-in. In February 2019, Nan Goldin led protesters from the Guggenheim Museum to the steps of the Metropolitan Museum to continue to put pressure on the museum. Goldin has committed to returning annually to the museum in protest until the institution divests from the Sackler Family, including removing the Sackler name from any museum spaces and declining future donations.

In 2021, the Met and the Sackler family jointly announced that the Sackler name would be removed from seven exhibition spaces, but would remain on two others: the Arthur M. Sackler Gallery in the Asian wing and the Marietta Lutze Sackler Gallery in the modern and contemporary wing.

=== National Portrait Gallery ===
London's National Portrait Gallery declined a $1.8 million donation from the Sackler Trust towards its $65 million renovations after pressure from the art community and the public, including statements by Nan Goldin that she would not show her work there if they continued to accept support from the Sacklers.

=== Freer-Sackler Gallery ===
Nan Goldin led a group of P.A.I.N. protesters with "Shame on Sackler" banners into the Smithsonian's Freer-Sackler Galleries in April 2018 to draw attention to the support that the Smithsonian institution has received from the Sackler Family.

=== Louvre ===
On July 1, 2019, a protest led by Nan Goldin and P.A.I.N. at the Louvre Museum resulted in the removal of the Sackler family name from wall placards in the Oriental Antiquities gallery, formerly the Sackler Wing of Oriental Antiquities.

=== Victoria and Albert Museum ===
In November 2019, Goldin and a group of 30 demonstrators placed "bottles of pills and red-stained "Oxy dollar" bills" on the Victoria and Albert Museum (V&A) courtyard's tiled floor. The group then staged a die-in.

In 2022, responding to pressure, the museum dropped ties with the Sackler family. In September it removed the most prominent signs to key areas of its Kensington site, the Sackler Centre for Arts Education, and the £2m tiled "Sackler Courtyard". It intends to choose new names for both.

== Impact ==
Purdue Pharma has responded to P.A.I.N.'s efforts with reports of an initiative on Corporate Social Responsibility, launched in March 2018. The corporation also spearheaded a PR campaign against activist Nan Goldin to discredit her criticism, before shifting their marketing focus from the United States to the developing countries.

Daniel Weiss, president of the Metropolitan Museum of Art, has revealed that the museum is reviewing policies which guide the acceptance of gifts to the museum. New York Academy of Sciences and Columbia University have also announced that they will review the philanthropic support they receive from the Sackler Family.

In March 2019, major museums and galleries began to reject support from the Sackler Trust UK, including the National Portrait Gallery and Tate. Tate had previously accepted approximately £4 million from Sackler Family philanthropies. Sackler Trust UK responded by halting new donations. The Louvre was the first museum, in July 2019, to remove the Sackler name from galleries as a result of protests two weeks earlier, although museum leadership refused to comment on the timing of the removal and instead cited museum policy on the duration of naming rights for funders.

== See also ==
- Decolonize This Place
- Liberate Tate
- Ethics of philanthropy
