= Temple of Dendur =

Ancient Egyptian temple on display in New York City

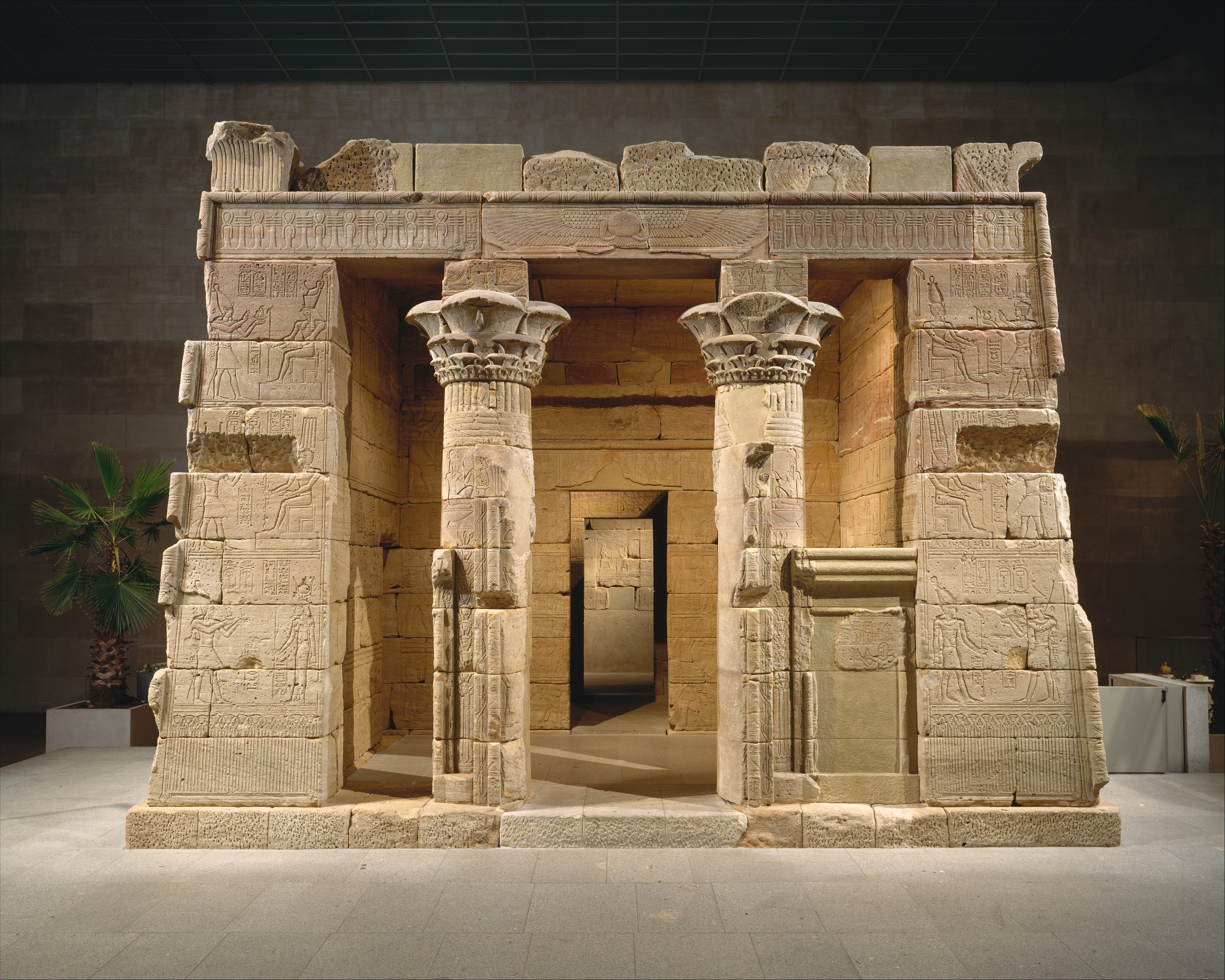
- Completion date: 10 BCE
- Medium: Aeolian sandstone
- Subject: Egyptian religion and mythology
- Dimensions: 4.9 m × 6.4 m × 13 m (16 ft × 21 ft × 43 ft)
- Location: Metropolitan Museum of Art; New York City, New York, U.S.; (Original placement: 23°22′59″N 32°57′00″E)
- Accession: 68.154

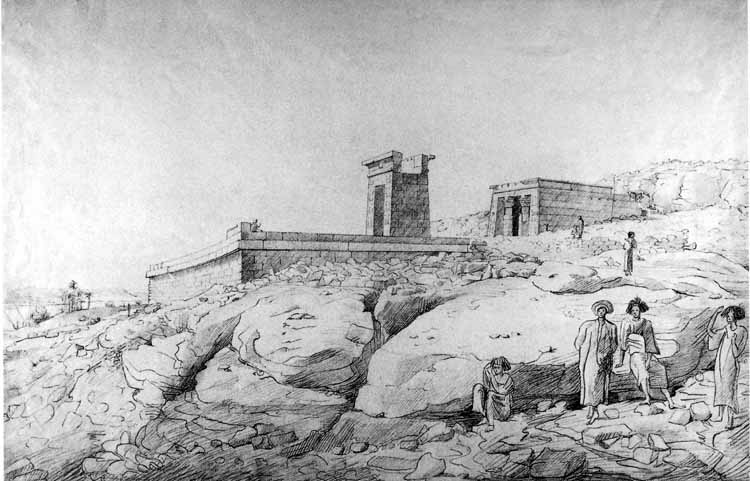
Temple complex drawing, 1817

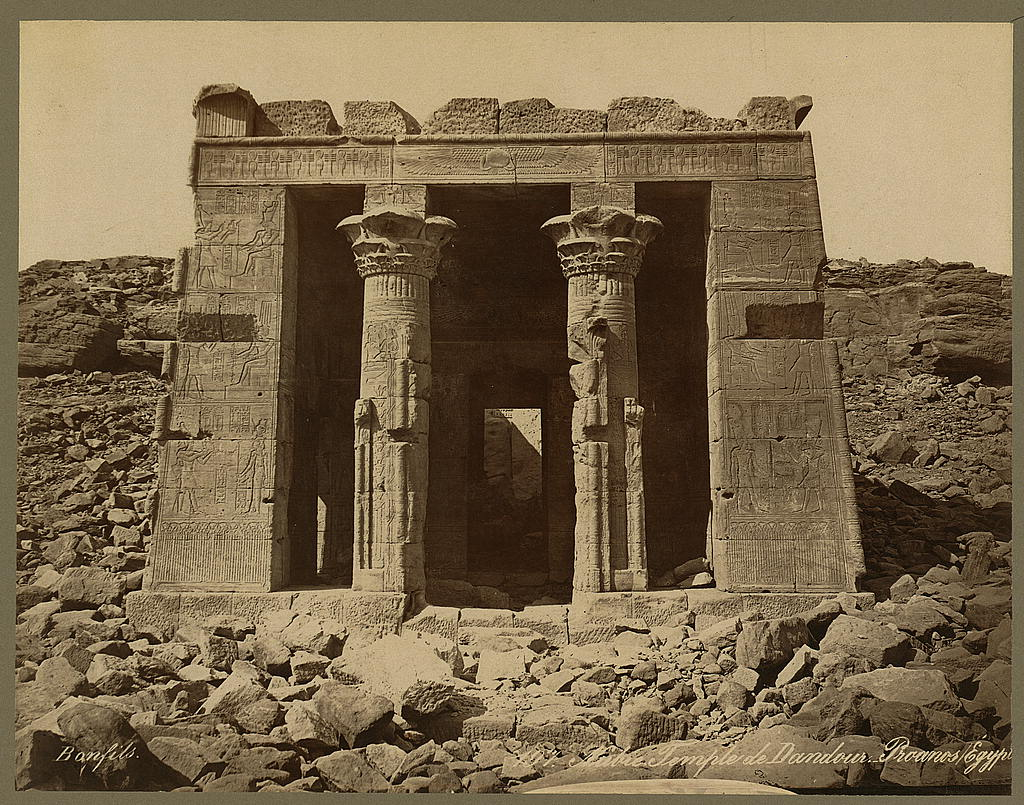
Photograph of the temple, 1867

The Temple of Dendur (Dendoor in the 19th century) is a Roman Egyptian religious structure originally located in Tuzis (later Dendur), Nubia about 80 kilometres (50 mi) south of modern Aswan. Around 23 BCE, Emperor Augustus commissioned the temple dedicated to the Egyptian goddess Isis and deified brothers Pedesi and Pihor from Nubia.

In 1963, as part of the International Campaign to Save the Monuments of Nubia, UNESCO helped rescue and relocate the temple from flooding caused by the Aswan High Dam. Egypt gave the temple to the Metropolitan Museum of Art in New York City, which has exhibited it since 1978.

== History ==
Petronius, the Roman governor of Egypt, built the Temple of Dendur at the request of Caesar Augustus, the emperor of Rome that included Egypt at that time. Originally named Octavian, Augustus became emperor after defeating Mark Antony and Egyptian Queen Cleopatra in 31 BCE. During his reign, Augustus had Egyptian-style temples built and dedicated to Egyptian gods and goddesses. However, he only commissioned a few temples in Nubia. One of those was the Temple of Dendur which he placed on the west bank of the Nile river in Tuzis (later Dendur, about 80 kilometres (50 mi) south of modern Aswan). Construction started in 23 BCE and finished in 10 BCE.

Augustus used the temple to legitimize and maintain his rule. Part of his strategy was connecting his name and image with Isis, the primary deity in Dendur, and the local cult of Pedesi and Pihor. It was more than a temple—it was also a home for the gods. When the local people visited the temple and brought traditional gifts of incense, wine, cold water, clothing, food, and milk, they nurtured their ruler, Augustus, and also ensured their community's prosperity.

In the sixth century, Coptic Christians used the temple as a church.

When Egypt increased the height of the Aswan Low Dam in 1933, the temple's proximity to the Nile was problematic. The temple complex began flooding for nine months each year.

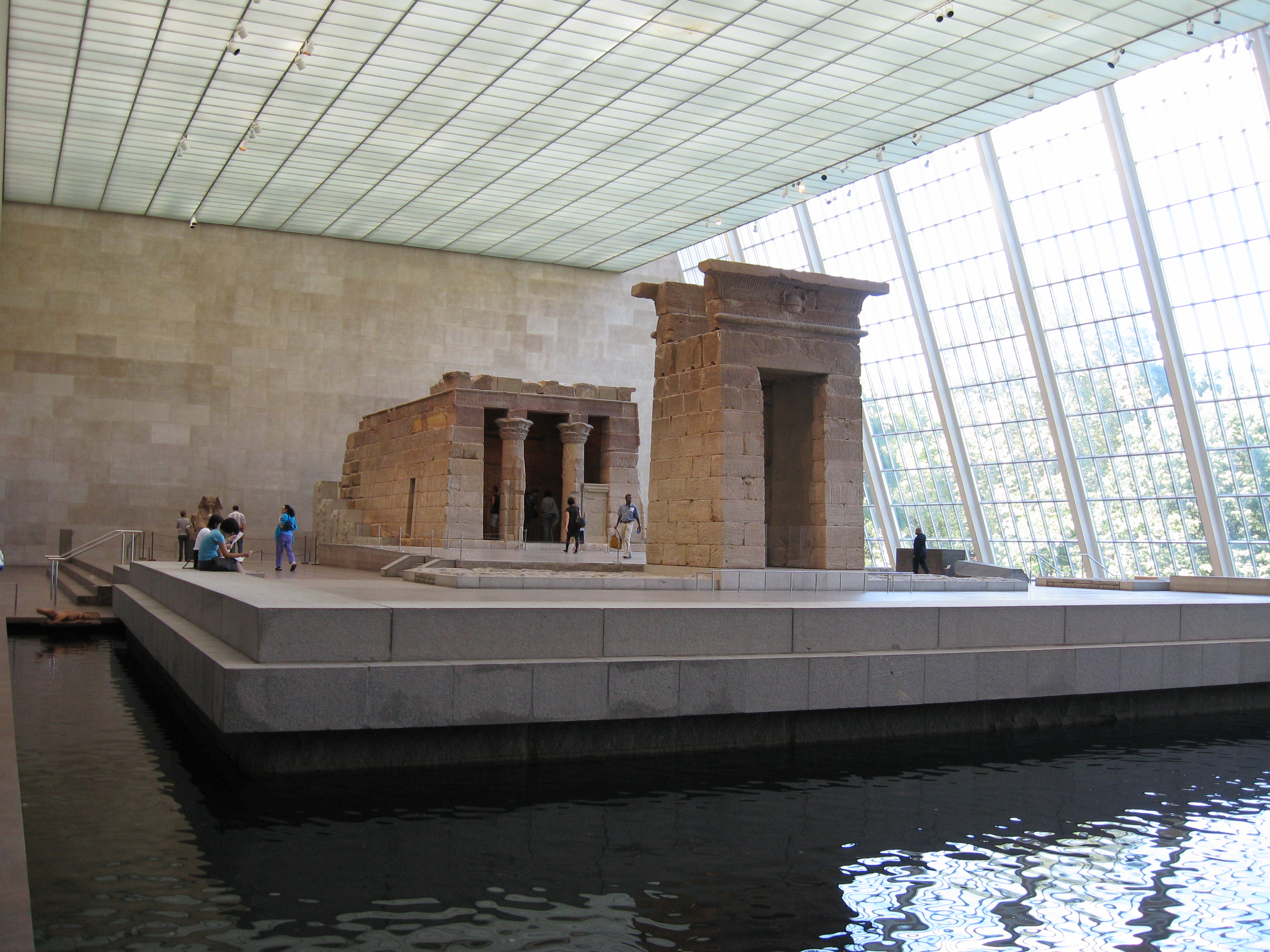
Temple installation at the Met (2007)

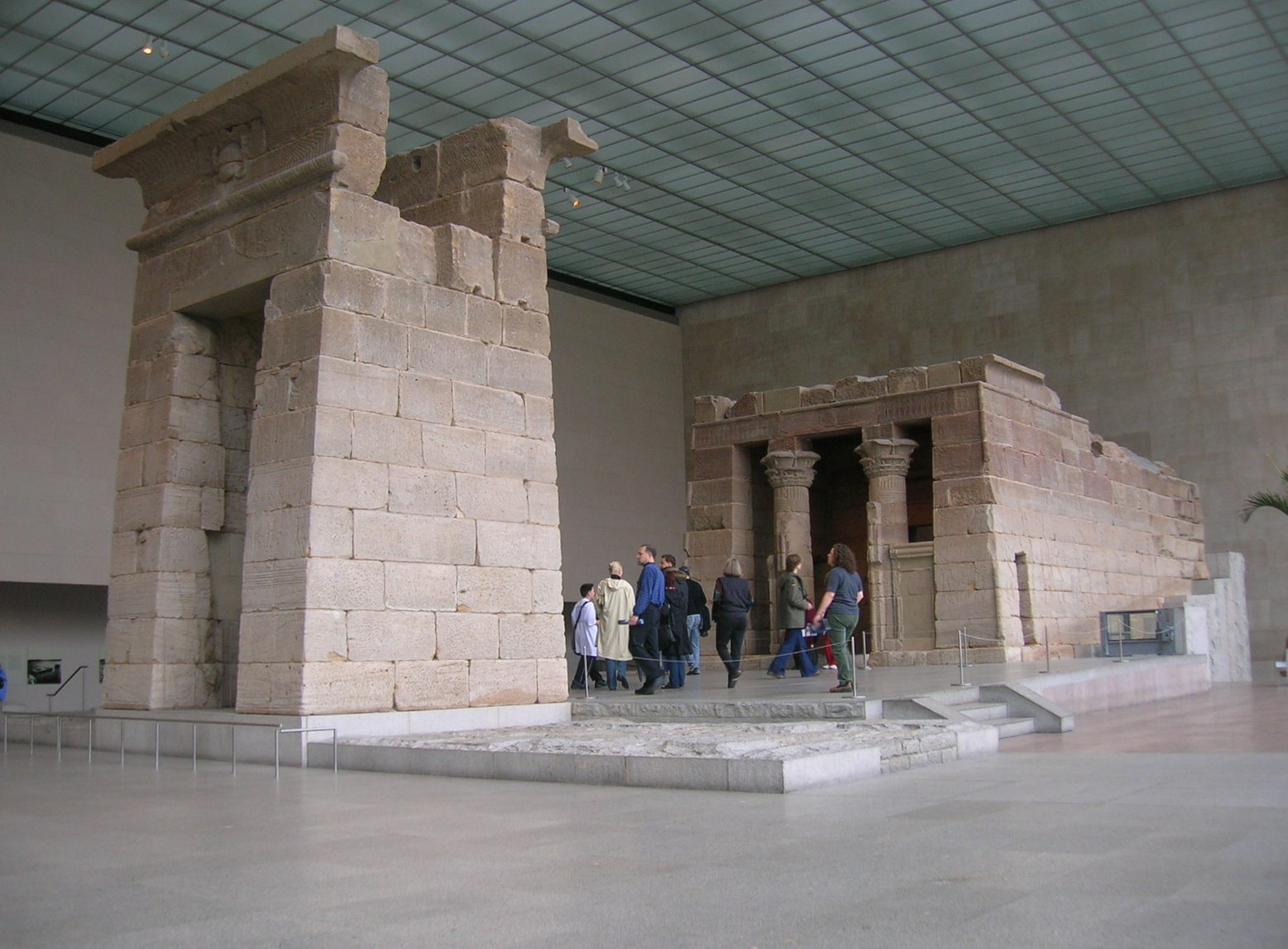
Temple installation at the Met (2005)

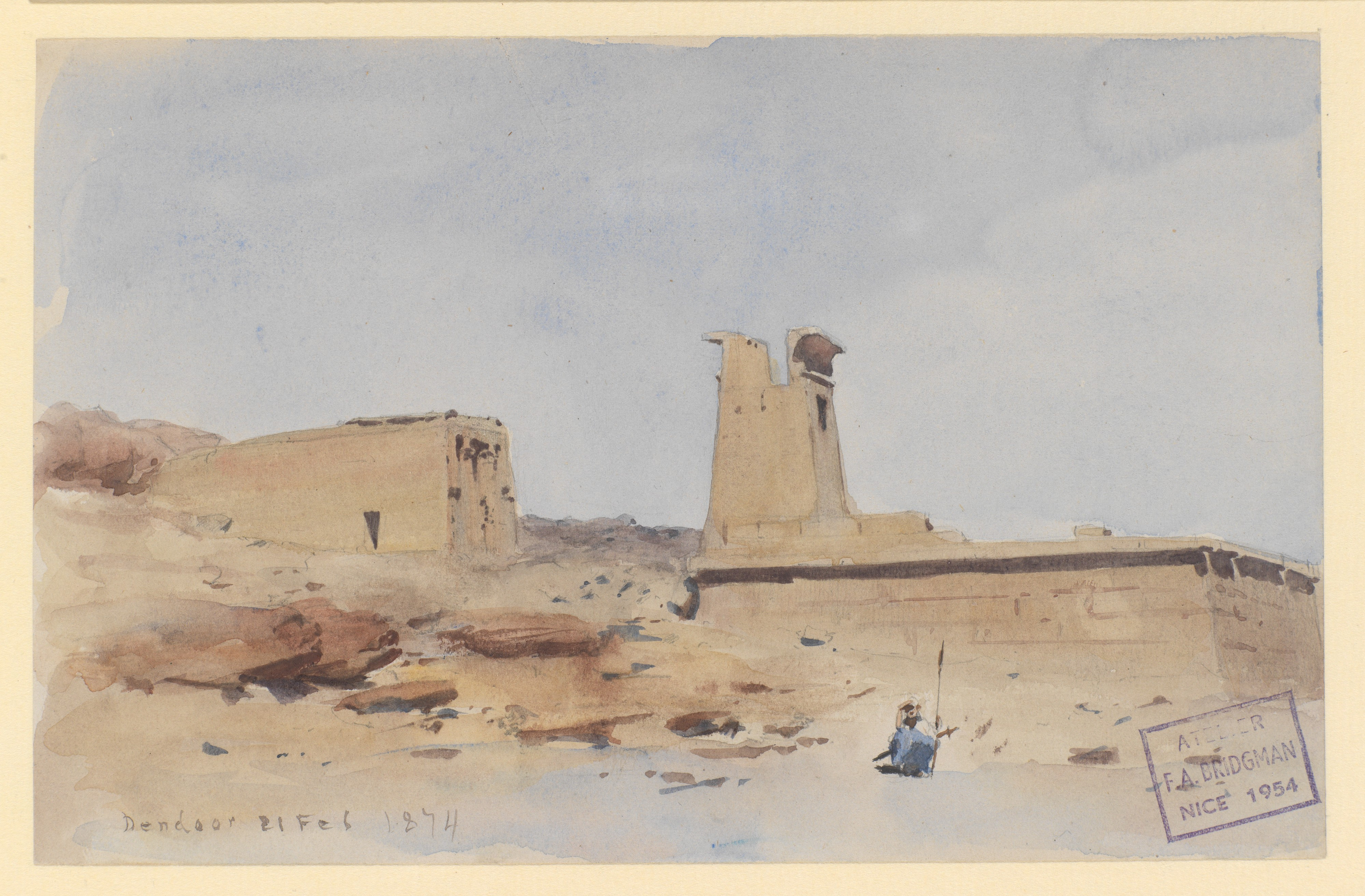
Painting showing the original site of the temple (left) and pylon (right), 1874

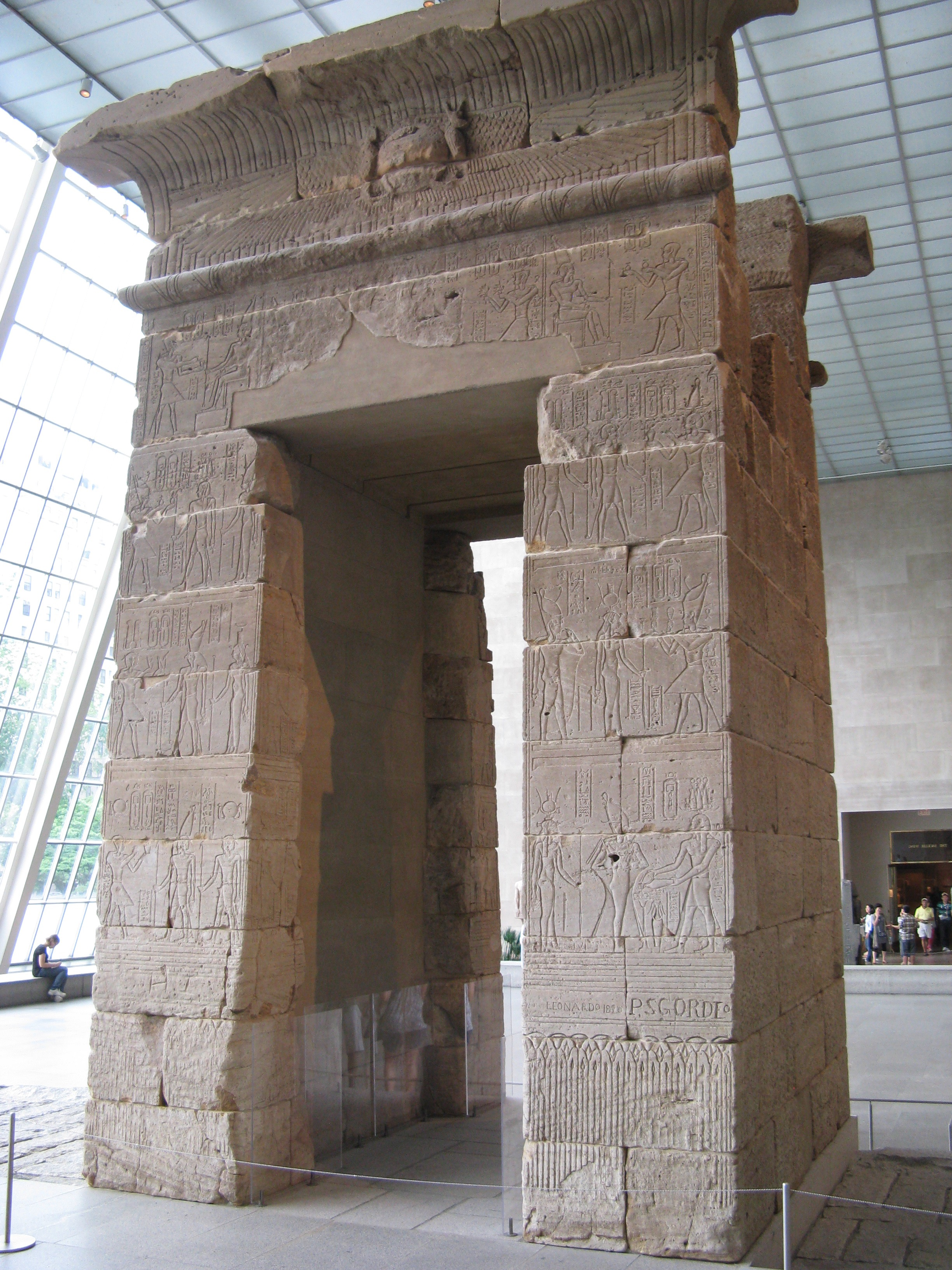
Pylon

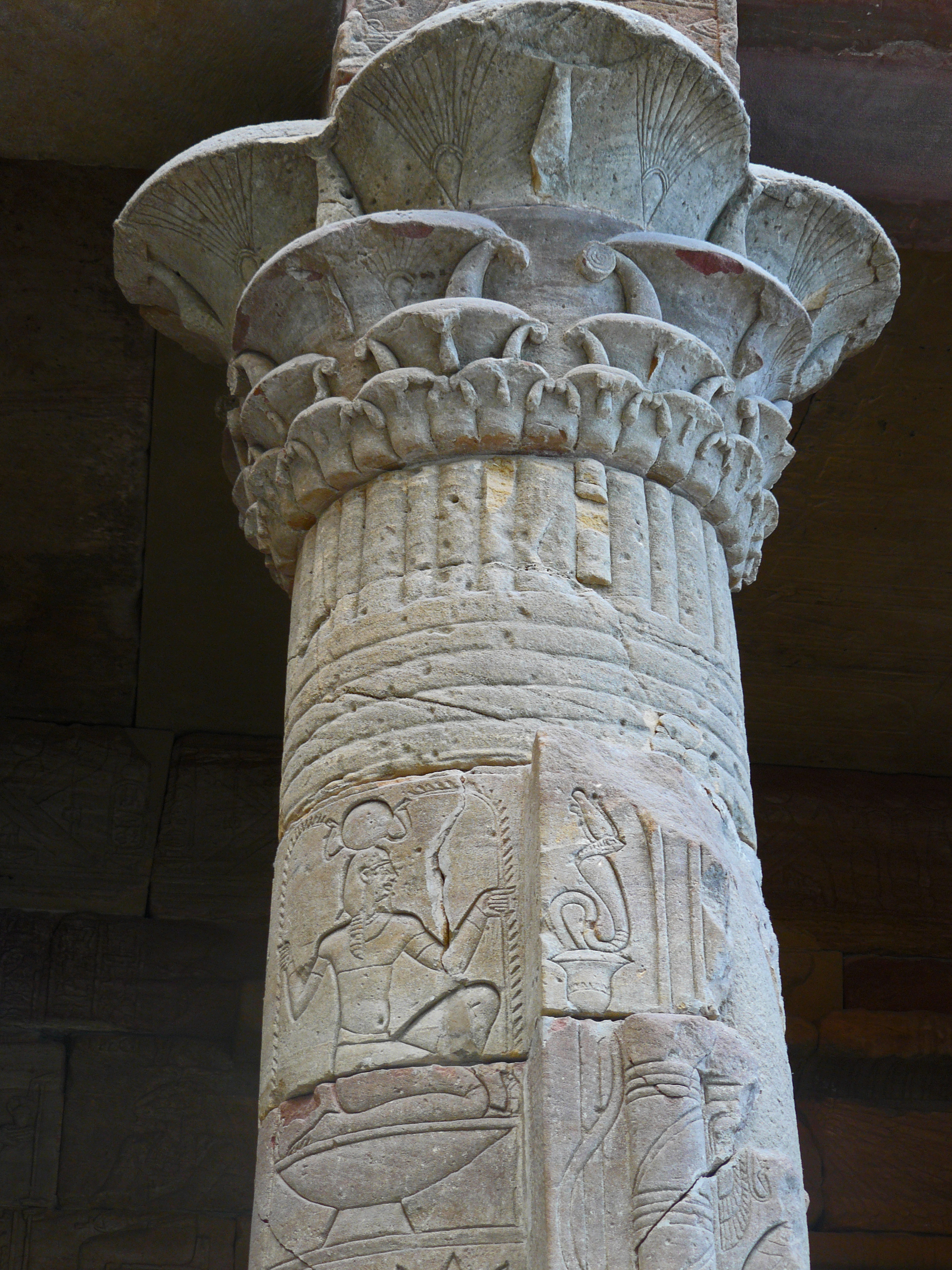
Column from the pronaos

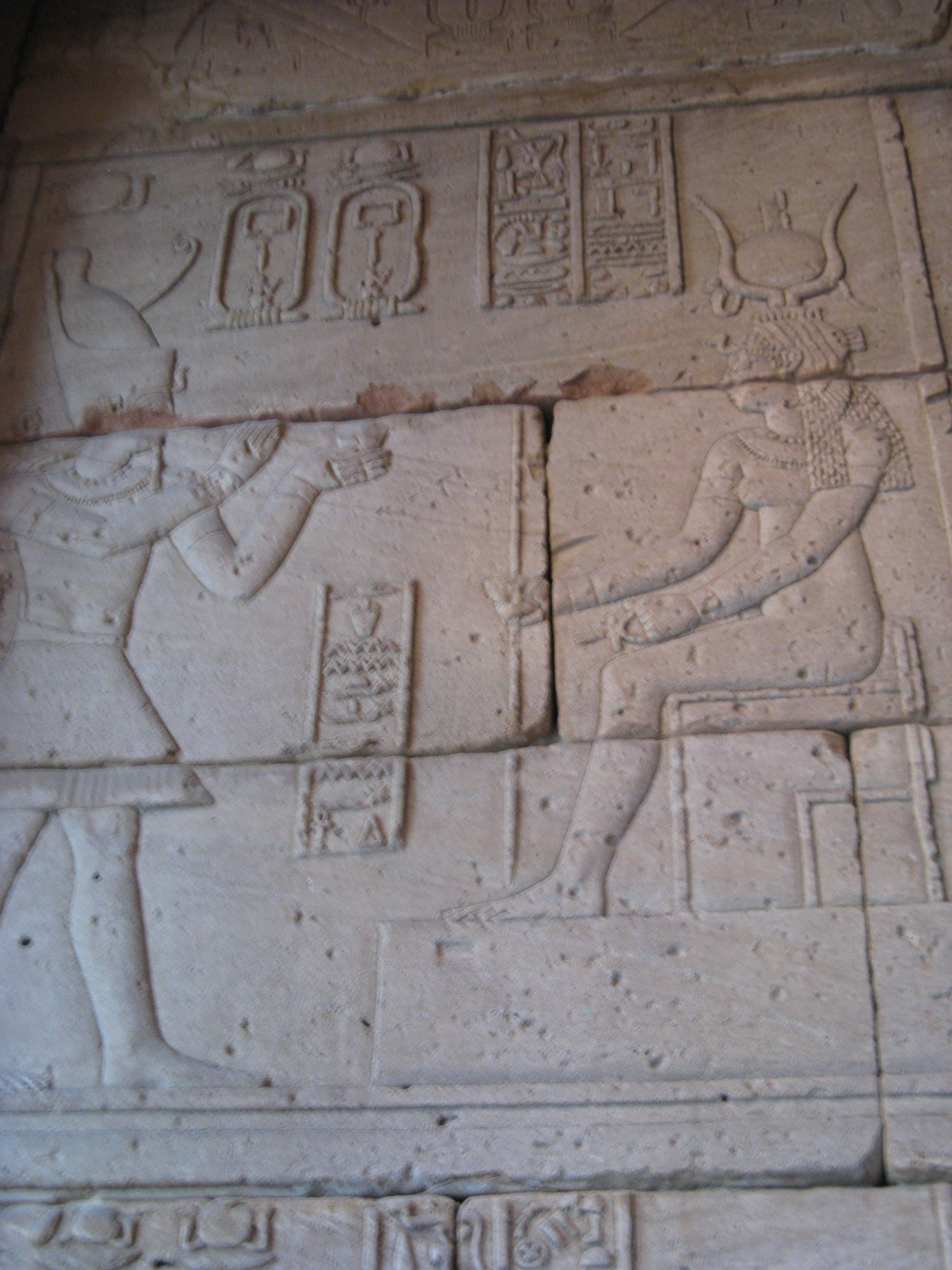
Augustus makes an offering to Isis

== Relocation ==
Egypt started building the Aswan High Dam in 1960. Plans called for Lake Nasser to submerge the temple permanently. UNESCO started the International Campaign to Save the Monuments of Nubia, including the Temple of Dendur. Fifty countries joined the effort, providing equipment, expertise, and money. Egyptologists, photographers, and architects documented and studied the temple for two years. In 1963, the temple was dismantled and moved from its original location.

In 1965, Egypt presented the temple to the United States in recognition of the United States' contribution of $16 million toward saving various other monuments threatened by the dam's construction. Jacqueline Kennedy accepted the gift on behalf of the United States. In 1967, the National Foundation on the Arts and the Humanities appointed a commission to consider applications from institutions interested in exhibiting the temple.

The press nicknamed the competition for the temple the "Dendur Derby". Museums in Cairo, Illinois and Memphis, Tennessee thought they were the ideal choice because their cities' namesakes were in Egypt. The commission did not agree. In 1966, President Johnson received hundreds of letters from schoolchildren asking for the temple to be relocated to Phoenix, Arizona. The Smithsonian Institution proposed erecting the temple on the banks of the Potomac River in Washington, D.C., while the Boston Museum of Fine Arts preferred the banks of the Charles River in Boston. However, the commission rejected these suggestions because the temple's sandstone would suffer from an outdoor environment.

On April 20, 1967, President Lyndon B. Johnson awarded the temple to The Metropolitan Museum of Art (the Met). The commission selected the Met because it had a clear plan to locate and protect the building from the weather, pollutants, and the different environment in the United States. The Met planned to display the temple inside a building where they could replicate Egypt's high temperatures and dry climate that preserved the structure for centuries.

The temple and its related pylon consisted of 661 blocks of sandstone weighing 640 tons (580,000 kg). Six years after being dismantled, the blocks were packed in 661 crates and transported to the United States by the freighter SS Concordia Star. The disassembled temple arrived in New York City on August 29, 1968. It cost $9.5 million to move the temple. Lila Acheson Wallace financially supported the relocation and rehousing of the Egyptian temple to the museum.

=== New Wing at the Met ===
To accommodate the temple, the Met added a new wing to its flagship building. Architects Kevin Roche and John Dinkeloo of Roche-Dinkeloo in Connecticut designed the new wing for the museum. Roche was a fan of Egyptian architecture and had previously incorporated pyramids into his building designs. To represent the Nile and the cliffs of the original location, the architects placed a reflecting pool in front of the temple and a sloping wall behind it; the temple retained its original orientation toward the east. They also designed a stippled glass ceiling and north wall to diffuse the light and mimic the lighting in Nubia. They used a chamber and technology to recreate the climate of Egypt.

On July 15, 1975, the museum's conservators and stonemasons started reconstructing the temple. The temple exhibit opened to the public on September 27, 1978. Six other galleries of Egyptian art are near the entrance of the Temple of Dendur. One art critic noted, "Architect Kevin Roche has created a 'display case' as successful in what it sets out to do as the tiny temple itself."

The Met named the wing containing the temple for the Sackler family: The Sackler Wing. In 2019, the museum stopped accepting contributions from the family because of the Sackler family's association with the opioid crisis. In 2021, The Met also decided to drop the name Sackler from the building's wing, as well as from the gallery that hosted the temple inside, which was called officially The Temple of Dendur in The Sackler Wing (Gallery 131). After the name changes the space housing the temple is, as of March 2023, just Gallery 131, and the former Sackler Wing remains unnamed.

== Architecture ==
The Temple of Dendur is a modest example of a temple from the Ptolemaic and Roman Periods, with roots in earlier Egyptian architectural style. Like the other temples in the region, it was designed by local Egyptian architects and constructed of Nubian sandstone blocks with a pink hue. These men would have worked with Augustus's men to develop the temple's inscriptions and carvings. The stone carvers and builders who created the temple used millennia-old Egyptian architectural esthetics and methods.

The temple complex was on a 30 metres (98 ft) sandstone platform or terrace overlooking the Nile. A mud brick wall surrounded the temple complex, running 25 metres (82 ft) from the front gate to its rear and 8 metres (26 ft) tall. Now lost, the wall once controlled access to the temple complex. The gateway from the Nile was a monumental pylon that survives. The Egyptians called this gate "the Luminous Mountain Horizon". The pylon is decorated with relief carvings, has rounded tori at the corners and tops of its walls, and is capped with a cavetto cornice, a common design element in Egyptian buildings. A processional way or dromas led 30 feet (9.1 m) from the pylon across a wba (open court) to the temple building.

The temple has a modest but well-executed design. It is 42.7 feet (13.0 m) long by 21.5 feet (6.6 m) wide by 16 feet (4.9 m) high. Because of the steep slope of the riverbank, the rear of the temple was set into the rocky bank. The tops and corners of its walls feature a rounded tori, traditional in ancient Egyptian design.

The temple consists of three sections: the pronaos, the antechamber, and the sanctuary. The pronaos or porch is the front of the temple. It includes two highly decorated columns with composite tops depicting lotus blossoms, a style first used in Egypt between 664 and 525 BCE. Next is the antechamber or offering hall. Originally separated by wooden doors, the antechamber opens into the sanctuary where the Egyptians believed the gods resided. Inside the sanctuary was a repository stone for sacred bark and a statue niche. The back wall of the sanctuary has a hidden chamber that is 9.5 feet long by 6 feet long x 2.25 feet wide. The chamber is accessed by pivoting a block of stone on the outer southern wall. Its purpose is unknown.

In the cliffs behind the temple, there was a small chamber cut into the rock face. It may have been where Pedesi and Pihor were buried or a representation of their tomb.

=== Ornamental decorations ===
Amelia Edwards, an English writer who visited the temple on her 19th-century tour up the Nile, wrote:

At Dendoor, when the sun is setting ... we visit a tiny Temple on the western bank. It stands out above the river surrounded by a wall of enclosure ... The whole thing is like an exquisite toy, so covered with sculptures, so smooth, so new-looking, so admirably built. Seeing them half by sunset, half by dusk, it matters not that these delicately-wrought bas-reliefs are of the Decadence school. The rosy half-light of an Egyptian afterglow covers a multitude of sins, and steeps the whole in an atmosphere of romance.

The temple is decorated throughout with relief carvings which were originally painted in bright colors. The figures depicted include Augustus as a pharaoh interacting with goddesses and gods. Some of those divine beings are Amun of Debod, Arensnuphis, Harpocrates, Hathor of Bigga, Horus, Isis, Khnum, Osiris, Mandulis, Nephthys, Satis, Tephenis, and Thoth. The carvings also honor two heroic Nubian brothers turned demigods named Peteese and Pihor. Pedesi means "he whom Isis has given" and, Pihor means "he who belongs to Horus."

The temple base has carvings of papyrus and lotus plants growing out of the Nile, symbolizing the god Hapi. Over the pylon and above the entrance to the temple proper is the Winged sun disk of the sky god Horus, representing the sky. The vultures on the ceiling of the pronaos repeat the sky motif.

The antechamber and the sanctuary are undecorated, except for the reliefs on the antechamber door frame and the back walls of the sanctuary. The latter show Pihor and Pedesi as young gods worshiping Isis and Osiris, respectively.

The temple's outer walls feature sunk relief carvings of Emperor Augustus as a pharaoh making offerings to the deities Isis, Osiris, and their son Horus. The subject repeats in raised relief carvings in the first room of the temple, showing Augustus as he prays and makes offerings. Hieroglyphs associated with the carvings refer to Augustus as Caesar, Pharaoh, and Autotrator. The latter is an alteration of Autokrator, or autocrat, the Greek equivalent of imperator. This misspelling seems deliberate to achieve greater symmetry in the hieroglyphs.

The exterior south doorway features cobras wearing crowns from upper and lower Egypt. To the left is a white crown, a symbol of upper Egypt, and a red crown for lower Egypt. On the left side, there is a depiction of Isis standing and wearing a close-fitting sheath, a headpiece horn from a cow, and a winged disk representing the sun god. In one hand, she holds an ankh, a symbol of life.

The scene on the inner south wall of the pronaos depicts the pharaoh and the two brothers Pihor and Pedesi with gifts of incense and water. The Egyptians believed that the pharaoh or Augustus could live forever by giving incense to the gods. The two brothers were both sitting and holding in one hand a staff called a scepter, a symbol of authority and the symbol of life. The pronaos north wall depicts Isis. The columns of the pronaos are decorated with sunk reliefs of men bringing offerings of animals and flowers to the temple.

On the east side of the pylon, the relief depicts Augustus with a linen bag in his hand in front of Pedesi and Pihor. The south ramp has a relief of Augustus making an offering of a cobra (the cobra of truth) to the god Harnedotes. Here, Augustus is depicted in Egyptian attire—a kilt with a bull's tail and the white crown of Upper Egypt.

== Damage and graffiti ==
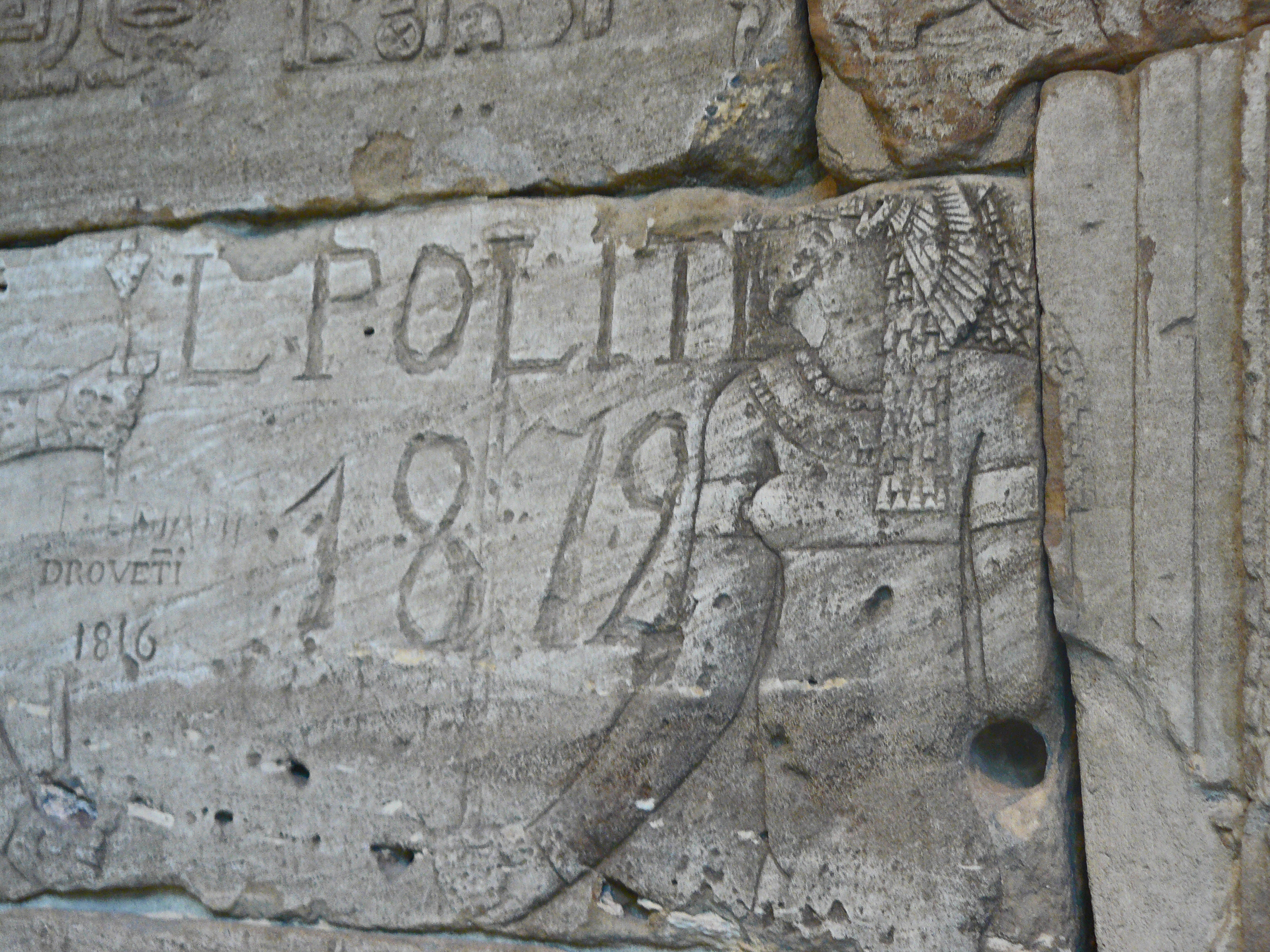
19th-century graffiti

When it was along the Nile, visitors to the temple inscribed graffiti on the structure. As early as 10 BCE, a visitor carved an oath on the north wall of the pronaos near the image of Pihor. There is also graffiti on the pylon. In the 19th century, European visitors left graffiti on the temple walls. British naval officer and later Rear Admiral Armar Lowry Corry carved the prominent inscription, "A L Corry RN 1817", on the left side as one enters the temple. Italian Egyptologist Girolamo Segato also left a graffiti inscription.

Some damage was caused in the sixth century when the temple was used as a church. Presbyter Abraham documented the consecration of the building into a Christian church by carving into the walls. The Christians cut a doorway into the north wall in the pronaos, damaging the relief carving of Isis. However, they restored her lost arm by changing its angle at the elbow. They also installed a cross on the temple's roof and covered the reliefs with plaster. When Nubia became Muslim in the 13th century, the Christian Church was deserted.

Many parts of the deserted structure disappeared or were damaged when the local people took stone and bricks for repurposing. By the modern era, the mud-brick walls that surrounded the entire temple complex had vanished. Archaeologists learned there were entry gates on the north and south walls because remnants matched the surviving pylon, which was to the east of the temple.

In 1933, Aswan Low Dam was increased in height. As a result, the temple complex was underwater for nine months each year for the next thirty years. During this time, all traces of paint that remained on the temple's carvings were washed away.

When the temple was relocated, the tomb in the rockface behind it was left in place and covered by rising water.

== Relocations of other temples ==
UNESCO assisted in relocating and donating four other temples:

- Temple of Kalabsha to the Ägyptisches Museum in Berlin, Germany
- Temple of Taffeh to Rijksmuseum van Oudheden in Leiden, Netherlands
- Temple of Ellesyia to the Museo Egizio in Turin, Italy
- Temple of Debod to Madrid, Spain

== See also ==
- Stadium diplomacy – Financing of stadiums as a diplomatic tool
