= List of fellows of the American Marketing Association =

According to the American Marketing Association (AMA) "The distinction of “AMA Fellow” is given to members in good standing of the AMA who have made significant contributions to the research, theory and practice of marketing, and/or to the service and activities of the AMA over a prolonged period of time."

== 2026 ==
- Anders Gustafson, Norwegian Business School
- PK Kannan, University of Maryland
- Aric Rindfleisch, University of Illinois
- Hari Sridhar, Texas A&M University

== 2025 ==
- Sundar G. Bharadwaj, University of Georgia
- Rajesh K. Chandy, London Business School
- Rajdeep Grewal, University of North Carolina
- Kevin Lane Keller, Dartmouth College
- Rebecca J. Slotegraaf, Indiana University

== 2024 ==
- Harald van Heerde, University of New South Wales
- Ron Hill, American University
- Robert Leone, Texas Christian University
- Lisa Scheer, University of Missouri
- Venkatesh Shankar, Southern Methodist University
- Vanitha Swaminathan, University of Pittsburgh

== 2023 ==
- Robin A. Coulter, University of Connecticut
- Mark B. Houston, Texas Christian University
- J. Jeffrey Inman, University of Pittsburgh
- Sandy Jap, Emory University
- Richard G. Netemeyer, University of Virginia
- William Qualls, University of Illinois at Urbana-Champaign

== 2022 ==
- Dhruv Grewal, Babson College
- Jan Heide, University of Wisconsin-Madison
- Eli Jones, Texas A&M University

== 2021 ==
- Christian Homburg, University of Manheim and University of Manchester
- Deborah MacInnis, University of Southern California
- JB Steenkamp, University of North Carolina at Chapel Hill
- David Stewart, Loyola Marymount University
- Beth Walker, Colorado State University
- Jerome Williams, Rutgers University-Newark

== 2020 ==
- Mary Jo Bitner, Arizona State University
- Vijay Mahajan, University of Texas
- Rajendra Srivastava, Indian School of Business

== 2019 ==
- Mary Gilly, University of California-Irvine
- Bernard Jaworski, Claremont Graduate University
- Linda Price, University of Oregon
- Gerard Tellis, University of Southern California

== 2018 ==
- Wayne DeSarbo, Pennsylvania State University
- V. Srinivasan, Stanford University
- Michel Wedel, University of Maryland

== 2017 ==
- Ajay Kohli, Georgia Institute of Technology
- V. Kumar, Georgia State University
- John Lynch, University of Colorado
- Christine Moorman, Duke University

== 2016 ==
- Ruth Bolton, Arizona State University
- Katherine Lemon, Boston College
- A. Parasuraman, University of Miami
- Vithala R. Rao, Cornell University

== 2015 ==
- Richard Bagozzi, University of Michigan
- Frank Bass, University of Texas
- Leonard Berry, Texas A&M University
- James Bettman, Duke University
- Gilbert Churchill, University of Wisconsin-Madison
- George Day, University of Pennsylvania
- Paul E. Green, University of Pennsylvania*
- Shelby D. Hunt, Texas Tech University
- Philip Kotler, Northwestern University
- William Lazer, Michigan State University
- Donald Lehmann, Columbia University
- Sidney Levy, University of Arizona
- Gary Lilien, Pennsylvania State University
- Robert Lusch, University of Arizona
- Richard J. Lutz, University of Florida
- Kent Monroe, University of Illinois
- Leigh McAlister, University of Texas
- Donald Morrison, UCLA
- William Perreault, University of North Carolina
- Robert Peterson, University of Texas at Austin
- Roland Rust, University of Maryland
- Jagdish Sheth, Emory University
- Richard Staelin, Duke University
- Louis Stern, Northwestern University
- Rajan Varadarajan, Texas A&M University
- Barton Weitz, University of Florida
- William Wilkie, University of Notre Dame
- Jerry Wind, University of Pennsylvania
- Russell Winer, New York University
- Gerald Zaltman, Harvard University
- Valarie Zeithaml, University of North Carolina
