= Venkatesh Shankar =

American professor and author

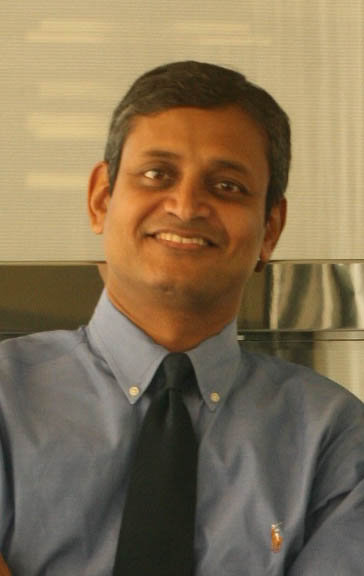
- Venkatesh Shankar
- Education: IIT Kharagpur; IIM Calcutta; Northwestern University
- Occupations: Marketing Professor, Author and Consultant
- Website: www.venkyshankar.com

Venkatesh Shankar is an American marketing professor, consultant and author. He is currently Brierley Endowed Professor of Marketing, Department Chair, and Academic Director of Brierley Institute for Customer Engagement at Cox School of Business, Southern Methodist University. He is the co-editor of the Handbook of Marketing Strategy and the author of Shopper Marketing.

Shankar is widely cited in the fields of marketing strategy, digital strategy, artificial intelligence, international marketing, innovation, new product management, pricing, retailing, and branding. The Shankar-Spiegel Award is named in his honor.

== Education ==
Shankar received his bachelor's degree in engineering from Indian Institute of Technology Kharagpur in 1984, and he completed his MBA at the Indian Institute of Management Calcutta in 1986. He received his Ph.D. in Marketing at the Kellogg School of Management in Northwestern University in 1995.

== Career ==
Shankar started his academic career at the Robert H. Smith School of Business at University of Maryland, where he served as co-director, Quality Enhancement Systems and Teams (QUEST) Program from 1998 to 2000 and as an associate professor from 2000 to 2004. He was Visiting Scholar at Sloan School of Management, Massachusetts Institute of Technology from 2001 to 2002. In 2004, he joined the Mays Business School at Texas A&M University as a professor and Coleman Chair in Marketing. During his time at Mays Business School, Shankar served as Marketing PhD Program Director from 2006-to 2012 and as Research Director of the Center for Retailing Studies from 2012 to 2023. Shankar was Academic Trustee of Marketing Science Institute from 2007 to 2013. He was a Visiting Scholar at the Graduate School of Business, Stanford University during 2017 and 2026.

Shankar is currently Harold M. Brierley Endowed Professor, Department Chair, and Academic Director, Brierley Institute for Customer Engagement at Cox School of Business, Southern Methodist University. Shankar has consulted with organisations such as Allstate, AT&T, Capgemini Ernst & Young, Colgate Palmolive, Deloitte, GlaxoSmithKline, Hewlett Packard, HSBC, Humana, IBM, Intel, Lockheed Martin, Lucent Technologies, Marriott International, Medtronic, Microsoft, Northrop Grumman, PepsiCo, Philips, and Volvo.

== Publications ==
Shankar has published in academic journals such as the Journal of Marketing Research, Management Science, Marketing Science, Strategic Management Journal, Journal of Marketing, Journal of Public Policy and Marketing, Journal of Retailing, Harvard Business Review, and Sloan Management Review, and in business periodicals such as Wall Street Journal and Financial Times.

== Awards ==
- In 2024, received Charles Coolidge Parlin Award.
- In 2024, named AMA Fellow by the American Marketing Association.
- In 2020, 2021, and 2022, was ranked among Top 1% of scientists in marketing by Mendeley Data based on citation data covering 7 million scientists in 22 major fields.
- In 2022, received Margaret H. Blair Award for Marketing Accountability from the Marketing Accountability Standards Board (MASB).
- In 2017, named AMS Cutco/Vector Distinguished Marketing Educator by the Academy of Marketing Science.
- In 2015, received Distinguished Alumnus Award from the IIT Kharagpur.
- In 2014, earned EMAC-IJRM Steenkamp Award for Long-term Marketing Impact from the International Journal of Research in Marketing.
- In 2014, listed among The World's Most Influential Scientific Minds. According to Thomson Reuters, “(Researcher with) the greatest numbers of reports officially designated by Essential Science Indicators as Highly Cited Papers—ranking among the top 1% most cited for their subject field and year of publication—between 2002 and 2012.”
- In 2013, winner of the Indian Institute of Management, Calcutta (IIMC) Distinguished Alumnus Award.
- In 2013, awarded the Retailing Lifetime Achievement Award by the American Marketing Association for lifetime contributions to retailing research.
- In 2012, received the Vijay Mahajan Award from the American Marketing Association for his lifetime contributions to marketing strategy
- In 2006, received Robert B. Clarke Outstanding Educator Award from the Direct Marketing Educational Foundation for outstanding lifetime contributions to Direct and Interactive Marketing.
