= Vittal Rao =

Vittal Rao is the name of:

- Vithal Rao, Indian musician
- Vithala R. Rao, Indian-American academic
- Vithal Rao (1929–2015), Indian ghazal singer
- Vittal Rao K. (born 1942), Indian Tamil-language writer
- Devarakonda Vittal Rao (1947–2016), Indian politician
- Gummadi Vittal Rao, popularly known as Gaddar (born 1949), Indian balladeer and activist

== See also ==
- Vittal (disambiguation)
- Rao (disambiguation)
- Swami Ramdas (1884–1963), Indian spiritual teacher
