= Sachin Gupta (academic) =

Professor of Marketing

- Title: Henrietta Louis Johnson Professor of Management and Professor of Marketing

Academic background
- Education: Cornell University, Indian Institute of Management, Ahmedabad, St. Stephen's College

Academic work
- Discipline: Marketing
- Institutions: Samuel Curtis Johnson Graduate School of Management, Cornell University

Sachin Gupta is a marketing science academic, the Henrietta Louis Johnson Professor of Management and Professor of Marketing in the Samuel Curtis Johnson Graduate School of Management at Cornell University in Ithaca, New York State, and the former editor-in-chief of the American Marketing Association's Journal of Marketing Research, He is known for his work on marketing analytics, health care, privacy, and nonprofits.

Sachin Gupta serves on the Board of Directors of a 501 (c) 3 nonprofit that helps the Aravind Eye Care System spread eye care to India's rural populations and to other developing countries.

== Education ==
- B.A. (Honours) Economics, St. Stephen's College, Delhi University, India, 1982
- Post Graduate Diploma in Management, Indian Institute of Management, Ahmedabad, India, 1984
- Ph.D. in management, Cornell University, Ithaca, NY, 1993

== Selected publications ==
- Kim, Sungjin, Sachin Gupta and Clarence Lee. "Donors and Member-Donors for Effective Nonprofit Fundraising," Journal of Marketing, 72, no. 3 (2021): 48–63.
- Kim, Sungjin, Clarence Lee, and Sachin Gupta, “Bayesian Synthetic Control Methods,” Journal of Marketing Research, 57, 5, October, 831–852. Winner of the 2020 Paul E. Green Award of the American Marketing Association.
- Park, Sungho, and Sachin Gupta, “Handling Endogenous Regressors via Joint Estimation Using Copulas,” Marketing Science, 31, 4, 567-86
- Sachin Gupta, Aravind Haripriya, Ravilla D Ravindran, Thulasiraj Ravilla, "Differences Between Male and Female Residents in Case Volumes and Learning in Cataract Surgery" Journal of Surgical Education
- Yu Yu and Sachin Gupta, “Pioneering Advantage in Generic Drug Competition,” International Journal of Pharmaceutical and Healthcare Marketing, 8, 2, 2014. This article received the Outstanding Paper award for 2014.

According to Google Scholar, as of 20 January 2024 his works have been cited over 5570 times, giving him an h-index of 32.

== Honors ==
- American Marketing Association-EBSCO Annual Award for Responsible Research in Marketing
- Paul E. Green Award (2003 and 2020) by American Marketing Association
- William H. O'Dell Award (2008) by American Marketing Association
- Visiting Scholar Stanford University, Graduate School of Business, Jan – March 2019
- Visiting Professor MYRA School of Business, Mysore, India, March 2015
- Visiting professor, Indian School of Business, Hyderabad, India December 2004, November 2005
- Visiting professor, Nanjing University School of Management, Nanjing, China August 2005
