= Vittal =

Vittal may refer to:

- Vithoba, Hindu deity occasionally also known as Vittal

== Geography ==
- Vittal (town), town in Karnataka, India
  - Vittal Assembly constituency, former constituency of the Karnataka Legislative Assembly

== People ==
- Chilumula Vittal Reddy, Indian politician
- Dande Vittal, Indian politician
- Devarakonda Vittal Rao, Indian politician
- Gaddar (born Gummadi Vittal Rao), Indian poet
- Gopal Vittal, Indian business executive
- Katakadond Vittal Dondiba, Indian politician
- M. R. Vittal, Indian film director
- Madhav Vittal Kamath, Indian journalist
- Nagarajan Vittal, Indian civil servant
- Sivapatham Vittal, Indian surgical endocrinologist
- T. B. Vittal Rao, Indian politician
- Vittal Mallya, Indian entrepreneur
- Vittal Ramamurthy, Indian violinist
- Vittal Rai, Indian scientist
- Vittal Rao K., Indian writer

== See also ==
- Vital (disambiguation)
- Vittal Rao (disambiguation)
- Vitthalanatha (c.1516 - 1588), Indian philosopher
- Vitthala Shappath, a 2017 Indian film
