= Dominique M. Hanssens =

American marketing academic

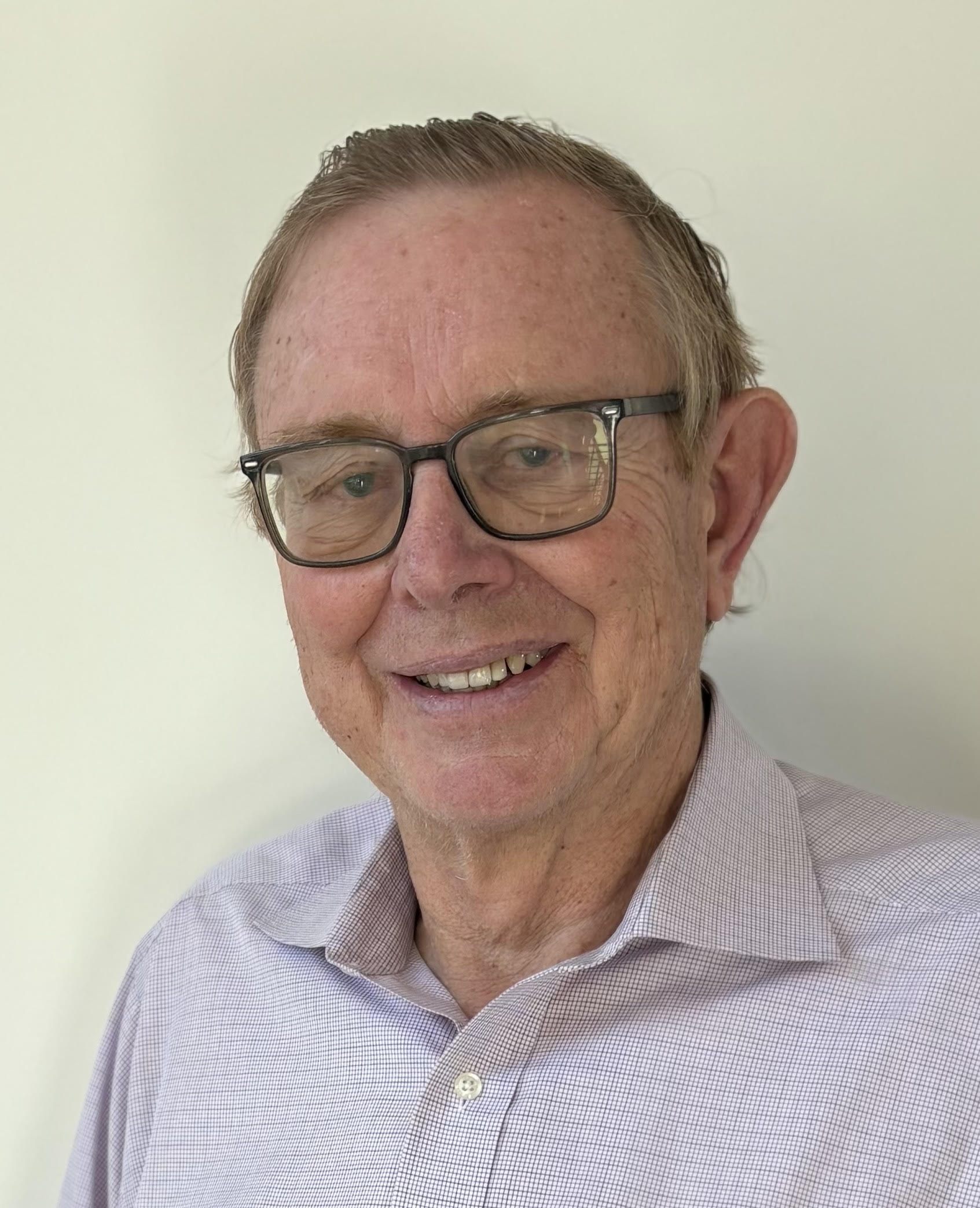
- Born: Belgium
- Occupations: Academic and marketing researcher
- Awards: Gilbert A. Churchill Award for Lifetime by the American Marketing Association

Academic background
- Education: University of Antwerp
- Alma mater: Purdue University

Dominique M. Hanssens is a Belgian-American academic and marketing researcher. He is a Distinguished Research Professor of Marketing at the UCLA Anderson School of Management. He is known for his work in marketing science, particularly in the fields of econometrics, marketing mix modeling and marketing strategy. He is the former executive director of the Marketing Science Institute and received Gilbert A. Churchill Award for Lifetime by the American Marketing Association.

== Life and education ==
He was born in Belgium. Hanssens studied applied economics at the University of Antwerp, earning a Licentiate in 1974. He later earned an M.S. and a Ph.D. in marketing from Purdue University in 1977.

== Career ==
Hanssens joined the faculty of UCLA Anderson in the late 1970s, where he served in leadership roles, including faculty chair, associate dean, and chair of the marketing area. He also served as the executive director of the Marketing Science Institute (MSI) in Cambridge, Massachusetts, from 2005 to 2007 and as president of the INFORMS Society for Marketing Science from 2015 to 2017.

His teaching spans marketing management, quantitative methods, strategy, and international marketing. Hanssens has received teaching awards, including the UCLA Anderson Neidorf "Decade" Teaching Award in 2003 and teaching excellence awards in the MBA and Executive MBA programs.

Hanssens has consulted to corporations, including Disney, Google, Microsoft, Hewlett-Packard, Johnson & Johnson, Mercedes, and Wells Fargo.

His work in the private sector focuses on the application of quantitative modeling to inform marketing strategy, particularly in areas such as brand equity, customer valuation, and marketing return on investment (ROI). In addition to his consulting activities, Hanssens has served as an expert witness in legal cases related to product liability, intellectual property, antitrust issues, and consumer behavior.

He sits on the academic advisory boards of Liftlab Analytics, GBK Collective, and is a founding partner of MarketShare, a marketing analytics company that was later acquired by TransUnion.

== Research ==
Hanssens' research focuses on strategic marketing problems, particularly the impact of marketing activities on business performance. He applies data-analytic methods, such as econometrics and time-series analysis, to investigate issues including marketing productivity, advertising effectiveness, and marketing resource allocation.

His academic work has appeared in leading journals across marketing, economics, and statistics. He has received Best Paper awards in Marketing Science (1995, 2001, 2002) and the Journal of Marketing Research (1999) and has been a finalist for additional awards.

Hanssens co-authored the book Market Response Models (with Leonard Parsons and Randall Schultz), published in its second edition by Kluwer Academic Publishers in 2001 and later translated into Chinese and Japanese.

== Awards ==
In 2003, Hanssens received the Neidorf “Decade” Teaching Award from the UCLA Anderson School of Management. In 2007, he was awarded with the Gilbert A. Churchill Award for Lifetime Achievement by the American Marketing Association. He was elected a Fellow of the INFORMS Society for Marketing Science in 2010, and in 2013, he received the AMA Vijay Mahajan Award for Career Contributions to Marketing Strategy Research. In 2015, the INFORMS Society for Marketing Science presented him with the Buck Weaver Award. His alma mater, Purdue University, honored him with the 2025 John S. Day Distinguished Alumni Academic Service Award.

== Selected publications ==
- Hanssens, Dominique M.; Parsons, Leonard J.; Schultz, Randall L. (1990), "Sales and Market Share Response Models", International Series in Quantitative Marketing, Dordrecht: Springer Netherlands, pp. 173–212, doi:10.1007/978-94-009-1073-7_6, ISBN 978-94-010-6972-4
- Gupta, Sunil; Hanssens, Dominique; Hardie, Bruce; Kahn, Wiliam; Kumar, V.; Lin, Nathaniel; Ravishanker, Nalini; Sriram, S. (2006). "Modeling Customer Lifetime Value". Journal of Service Research. 9 (2): 139–155. doi:10.1177/1094670506293810. ISSN 1094-6705.
- Villanueva, Julian; Yoo, Shijin; Hanssens, Dominique M (2008). "The Impact of Marketing-Induced Versus Word-of-Mouth Customer Acquisition on Customer Equity Growth". Journal of Marketing Research. 45 (1): 48–59. doi:10.1509/jmkr.45.1.48. ISSN 0022-2437.
- Srinivasan, Shuba; Hanssens, Dominique M. (2018-04-03), "Marketing and Firm Value: Metrics, Methods, Findings, and Future Directions", Long-Term Impact of Marketing, WORLD SCIENTIFIC, pp. 461–519, doi:10.1142/9789813229808_0012, ISBN 978-981-322-979-2
- Pauwels, Koen; Silva-Risso, Jorge; Srinivasan, Shuba; Hanssens, Dominique M. (2004). "New Products, Sales Promotions, and Firm Value: The Case of the Automobile Industry". Journal of Marketing. 68 (4): 142–156. doi:10.1509/jmkg.68.4.142.42724. ISSN 0022-2429.
- Nijs, Vincent R.; Dekimpe, Marnik G.; Steenkamps, Jan-Benedict E.M.; Hanssens, Dominique M. (2001). "The Category-Demand Effects of Price Promotions". Marketing Science. 20 (1): 1–22. doi:10.1287/mksc.20.1.1.10197. ISSN 0732-2399.
- Pauwels, Koen; Hanssens, Dominique M.; Siddarth, S. (2002). "The Long-Term Effects of Price Promotions on Category Incidence, Brand Choice, and Purchase Quantity". Journal of Marketing Research. 39 (4): 421–439. doi:10.1509/jmkr.39.4.421.19114. ISSN 0022-2437.
- Dekimpe, Marnik G.; Hanssens, Dominique M. (1995). "The Persistence of Marketing Effects on Sales". Marketing Science. 14 (1): 1–21. doi:10.1287/mksc.14.1.1. ISSN 0732-2399.
- Joshi, Amit; Hanssens, Dominique M. (2010). "The Direct and Indirect Effects of Advertising Spending on Firm Value". Journal of Marketing. 74 (1): 20–33. doi:10.1509/jmkg.74.1.20. ISSN 0022-2429.
