= Kathryn LaTour =

American academic

- Title: Banfi Vintners Professor of Wine Education and Management
- Spouse: Michael LaTour

Academic background
- Education: University of Colorado Boulder; Boston University; University of Iowa
- Thesis: Reconstructive memory in consumer decision-making (1997)

Academic work
- Institutions: University of Iowa; Harvard University; Auburn University; University of Nevada-Las Vegas; Cornell University

Kathryn LaTour is an American academic, researcher and author. She is an applied cognitive psychologist and currently serves as the Banfi Vintners Professor of Wine Education and Management at the School of Hotel Administration within Cornell University’s SC Johnson College of Business.

LaTour's research is focused on consumer learning and memory of hedonic experiences. Her early worked considered how easily consumer memories can be distorted, and her current work looks at ways in which to strengthen memories. LaTour uses both experimental and qualitative research methods for her research. Most of LaTour's experimental studies have involved either staging experiences or using field opportunities so she can study factors that influence the consumption experience. Her qualitative work has used ZMET (Zaltman Metaphor Elicitation Technique) as well as a variation using childhood memory elicitation. She has written over 70 scientific papers and book chapters.

Latour's research has been covered in media including USA Today and the New York Times. Some of her research focuses on memory distortion, nostalgia, differentiating online from land casino gambling, and developing new ways for learning complex products such as wine.

== Education ==
LaTour grew up in Northbrook, Illinois. She received a B.S. in Broadcast Production Management from the University of Colorado Boulder in 1989. After graduating from University of Colorado's journalism school she realized her interest in the managerial side of the industry. She then attended Boston University, where she received an M.S. in Broadcast Administration in 1991. In 1997, she received a Ph.D. in marketing from the University of Iowa. Her thesis was titled 'Reconstructive Memory in Consumer Decision Making'.

== Career ==
LaTour briefly taught at University of Iowa after completing her Ph.D. From 1997 to 2001 she was an associate at the Harvard Business School's Mind of the Market, working with Gerald Zaltman on cognitive neuroscience insights for managers. She taught psychology at Auburn University during that time. In 2004 she joined University of Nevada-Las Vegas as an assistant professor of Hospitality Marketing, becoming associate professor in 2008. She left University of Nevada in 2011 to joined Cornell University in 2012. At Cornell, she was chosen as the Banfi Vintners Professorship of Wine Education and Management in 2016.

== Research and work ==
LaTour's research is focused on consumer learning from and memory of hedonic experiences. Most of LaTour's experimental studies have involved either staging experiences or using field opportunities so she can study factors that influence the consumption experience. The experimental paradigm she has most used to study consumer memory is based on Elizabeth Loftus’ misinformation paradigm where consumers experience an event, then receive some information that was not part of the event (misinformation), and then are later tested for their memory of the original event. Initially she did a direct adaption looking at color of a product, in 1998, to determine if the paradigm would be effective given differences in credibility of the misinformation. It proved to be an effective paradigm for studying the effects of post-experience advertising on consumer memory for a range of product experiences, from the more simple changes in memory for the color of a candy wrapper to more central taste experiences to childhood memories of theme parks and fast food eateries. In 1999, she introduced reconstructive memory to consumer researchers with this paradigm and her subsequent research explored considerations for marketers given this potential for malleability. In total, she and her colleagues used the advertising misinformation paradigm or a variation of it in 14 published papers, with 29 experimental studies.

During her time at HBS’s Mind of the Market Lab she learned ZMET and has used that method to explore different aspects of consumer behavior such as gambling and wine consumption.

Though her early research focused on the malleability of consumer memory, she learned that consumers’ autobiographical memories are an important aspect for their identity regardless of their veracity. The importance of childhood memories in particular led to work with colleagues on nostalgia and developing a scale to incorporate personal nostalgia.

LaTour developed the Childhood Memory Elicitation Technique, which helps consumers remember childhood experiences by providing memory cues that takes them back in time. The consumer is then interviewed about those experiences. LaTour and her colleagues found this method effective in determining generational differences in attachment to automobiles, uncovering cross-cultural differences in gambling, providing insights into brand image, and offering suggestions for expansion plans of a cult product.

LaTour's research in early 2010s involved using multiple research tools and different theoretical perspectives to understand consumer behavior. In Humphreys and LaTour (2013), she along with investigated the language used to describe gambling (as a game vs gamble). On the sociocultural level, they conducted a content analysis of operant media frames for discussing online gambling and performed an event analysis and showed that a shift in consumer judgments follows an abrupt shift in frame; and on the individual level, they investigated the causal mechanism for these shifts in an experimental setting using the Implicit Association Test.

LaTour's more recent work considers how to develop stronger memories of experiences. In 2014, LaTour with colleagues Mike LaTour and Chuck Brainerd wrote the paper Fuzzy trace theory and “smart” false memories: Implications for advertising, which was the first consumer memory paper to introduce FTT, and it provides a larger framework for understanding how memory works in consumer judgment. It won the best paper of the year. Also in 2014 she wrote "Sticktion: Assessing Memory for the Customer Experience".

In a paper published in 2019, LaTour and John Deighton challenged the traditional analytic approach to learning to show that a holistic approach was more effective for creating experts. The insights were driven by qualitative interviews with Master Sommeliers and tested experimentally with experts and enthusiasts.

=== Teaching ===
LaTour has taught numerous classes during her career to both undergraduate and graduate students, such as Introduction to Marketing, Consumer Behavior, Marketing Research, Introduction to Psychology, Theories of Memory and Learning. At Cornell, she has developed two elective classes: Wine Marketing and Luxury Marketing. Also at Cornell, LaTour has served as the PhD Coordinator for the Marketing area and developed a doctoral seminar on Memory and Learning.

== Personal life ==
LaTour met her husband Michael LaTour while teaching as an adjunct in Psychology at Auburn University. They began to collaborate on research and married in 2001. In 2004 they joined the University of Nevada-Las Vegas. The LaTours moved to Ithaca New York in 2012 as Visiting Professors at Cornell University. Michael died in 2015.

== Awards and honors ==
- 1996 - M. Bhanu Murthy Award for Excellence in Teaching
- 1999 - Robert Ferber Award, Journal of Consumer Research, best article based on a dissertation.
- 2002 - JCR Policy Board Award for the best article in Journal of Consumer Research
- 2003 - selected as a Hearin Lecturer, School of Business Administration, University of Mississippi
- 2010 - Boyd Research Award in the William F. Harrah College of Hotel Administration
- 2013 - Great Mind Award for best academic paper appearing in the Journal of Advertising Research
- 2014 - Best article of year appearing in Cornell Hospitality Quarterly
- 2014 - Best article of year appearing in Journal of Advertising
- 2017 - Knowledge Matters faculty fellow, Provost Office of Faculty Development and Diversity, Cornell University

== Publications ==
=== Book chapters ===
- Kachen, Axenya and Kathryn LaTour (2018), “Sex, Gender and Advertising” In Marketing & Humanity: Discourses in the Real World, Cambridge Scholars Publishing.
- LaTour, Michael S. and Kathryn A. LaTour (2016), “Building an Integrated Marketing Communications Mindset For Hotel Managers,” In Handbook of Hotel Chain Management, Vincent Magnini (ed), Routledge.
- Cotte, June and Kathryn A. LaTour (2010), “Gambling Beliefs vs. Reality: Implications for Transformative Public Policy,” in Transformative Consumer Research for Personal and Collective Well-Being, David Glen Mick, Simone Pettigrew, Cornelia Pechmann and Julie L. Ozanne (eds.).
- LaTour, Kathryn A., Lewis P. Carbone and Suzie Goan (2009), “Managing Hospitality Experiences: Las Vegas Style,” in Memorable Customer Experiences: A Research Anthology, Adam Lindgreen, Joëlle Vanhamme, Michael Beverland (eds), Gower Publishing.
- LaTour, Kathryn A. (2008), “Advertising, Public Relations and Crisis Management,” chapter 7, prepared for the Handbook of Hospitality and Tourism, Haemoon Oh, editor.
- Law, Sharmsitha and Kathryn Braun (2003), "Gauging the Impact of Product Placements on Viewers: Practical and Theoretical Implications" L. J. Shrum (Ed), Blurring the Lines: The Psychology of Entertainment Media, Mahwah, NJ: Lawrence Erlbaum.
