= Rajendra Srivastava =

Indian academic (born 1951)

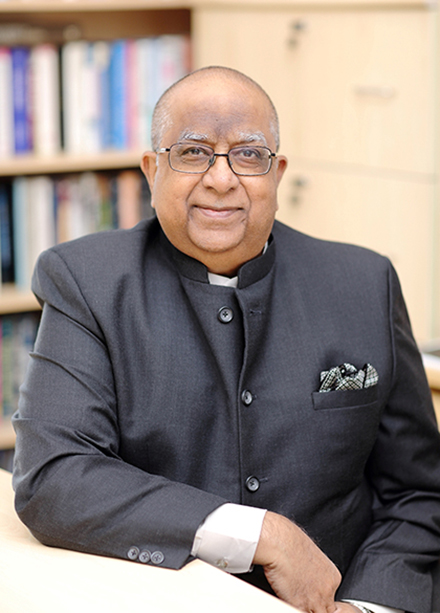
- Born: June 17, 1951 (age 75)
- Education: Ph.D. and MBA in Business Administration, B.Tech. (Honors) in Mechanical Engineering, MS (Industrial Engineering)
- Alma mater: University of Pittsburgh; The University of Rhode Island; Indian Institute of Technology Kanpur
- Occupation: Academic
- Title: Novartis Professor of Marketing Strategy and Innovation, Marketing at Indian School of Business (ISB)
- Awards: Maynard Award; Paul Root Award; Sheth Award; Vijay Mahajan Award; Alpha Kappa Psi Award

Rajendra K. Srivastava was Novartis Professor of Marketing Strategy and Innovation at the Indian School of Business. He has been a tenured professor and an academic administrator and has worked in the United States, Singapore, and India. He has been listed in the Forbes's Tycoons of Tomorrow 2018. He is also a member of the board of directors of Happiest Minds, a publicly listed company in India. Srivastava has held academic positions at Singapore Management University, the University of Texas at Austin, and Emory University.

== Education ==
1974-1979 Ph.D. (Business Administration), University of Pittsburgh
1974-1978 MBA, University of Pittsburgh
1972-1974 MS (Industrial Engineering), University of Rhode Island
1967-1972 B.Tech. (Mechanical Engineering), Indian Institute of Technology, Kanpur

== Academic career ==
Srivastava has held several prominent academic positions, including serving as Provost and Deputy President at Singapore Management University. He has also been a Senior Associate Dean at both the McCombs Business School at the University of Texas at Austin and the Goizueta Business School at Emory University. At UT-Austin, he held the George Kozmetsky Centennial Chair, and at Emory University, he was the Roberto C. Goizueta Chair in Marketing and Digital Commerce.

He serves as a Research Fellow at the Institute for Studies in Business Markets (ISBM) at the Smeal College of Business, Penn State University, and at IC-Sq. Institute at the University of Texas at Austin. Additionally, he is a Mack Institute Senior Fellow at the Wharton School, University of Pennsylvania. Srivastava has been a visiting professor at London Business School, and Helsinki School of Economics (source required).

Throughout his career, he has led innovation-driven and research-informed changes in academic programs. He advocates for a balance between theory and practice and for conducting research that informs and influences both management practices and public policy.

== Professional activities and research ==
Srivastava is committed to cross-functional integration in the management of business processes. He has championed inter-disciplinary research and academic programs and has nurtured multi-disciplinary areas of excellence in financial markets, innovation, and business analytics at SMU. This interest is also reflected in his work related to technology commercialization at ATI and IC2 Institute at UT Austin.

A highly cited scholar, his research, spanning marketing and finance/economics, has been published in Journal of Marketing, Journal of Marketing Research, Marketing Science and Journal of Banking and Finance. He was a guest editor for the Journal of Marketing Research's Special Issue on Brand Management and Equity, and the Journal of Marketing Special Issues on Marketing Strategy Meets Wall Street (2009 and 2016 [in process]). Additionally, he has served on the editorial boards of several academic journals including Journal of Marketing Research (JMR) and International Journal for Research in Marketing (IJRM).

Srivastava's research interests include Marketing Strategy, Marketing Metrics, and Brand/Customer Management. His current work focuses on Business Model Innovations, especially in Services, B2B, Technology and Emerging Markets. His current teaching interests include Business Model Innovation, Strategic Performance Management, Marketing Accountability and Driving Growth and Shareholder Value. He is best known for his work on measuring the impact of market-facing business processes (innovation, supply-chain and customer management) that create value for customers, and the value of market-based assets (customers, channels, brands and value networks). He is also well known for his work in competitive market structures and brand equity/strategic brand management.

== Awards and accolades ==
Srivastava was inducted as an AMA Fellow by the American Marketing Association in 2020. He is the recipient of the 2004 AMA Marketing Strategy SIG Mahajan Award for Career Contributions to Marketing Strategy. He also received the 1985 Alpha Kappa Psi Award from the American Marketing Association for the article in the Journal of Marketing judged to contribute most to the practice of marketing. In 1993 and 2002 he received the highest recognition for research at The University of Texas – the CBA Foundation Awards for Outstanding Research Contributions and Excellence. His paper on Market-Based Assets in the Journal of Marketing received both the 1998 Maynard Award for the article judged to contribute most to the development of theory in marketing and the MSI/Paul Root Award for the article judged to contribute most to the practice of marketing, the only time a single paper has won both awards. This same paper went on to win the AMA/Sheth Foundation Award for Long-Term contributions to the discipline of marketing. He is a recipient of the Marketing Science Institute's Research Awards on Brand Equity and on Assessment of the Value of Information Technology.

- 2010 Sheth Foundation Best Paper Award for Journal of the Academy of Marketing Science (Volume 37, 2009) (May 2010)
- 2009 Lifetime Achievement Award, Academy of Marketing, Brand SIG (April 2010)
- 2007 Award for Most Relevant (Bridging Theory and Practice) Executive MBA Course, Modular EMBA program, Emory University
- 2007 Sheth Foundation Award for the article written in Journal of Marketing during the previous five to ten years that is judged to contribute most to the marketing discipline (February)
- 2005 Nominated for Educator of the Year Award, Academy of Marketing Science
- 2004 AMA Marketing Strategy SIG Mahajan Award for Career Contributions to Strategy
- 2002 Chair for The Outstanding Submission for the 2002 ISBM Business Marketing Doctoral Support Award Competition (Maria Merino's Dissertation on Impact of Marketing on Corporate Risk)
- 2002 University of Texas CBA Foundation Award for Research Excellence (for Contributions to Research on Marketing-Finance Interface)
- 2002 Nominated for Teaching Excellence in Executive Programs, University of Texas
- 1999 Maynard Award by the American Marketing Association for 1998 Journal of Marketing article judged to contribute most to the development of theory in marketing
- 1999 Marketing Science Institute/Paul Root Award by the American Marketing Association for 1998 Journal of Marketing article judged to contribute most to the practice of marketing
- 1999 MSI Best Paper Award for all manuscripts published during 1997 in the MSI Working Paper Series. Trustees of the MSI member companies confer this award.
- 1995 co-chair for Best University-Wide Doctoral Dissertation at The University of Texas (Thesis – Goutam Challagalla; Co-chair – Dr. Tassu Shervani)
- 1993 University of Texas CBA Foundation Award for Outstanding (Lifetime) Research Contributions
- 1993 Nominated for the Joe D. Beasley Award (MBA Marketing Management Core Course)
- 1992 Nominated for University Graduate Teaching Excellence Award by the Marketing Department
- 1991 Honorable Mention, Marketing Science Institute Research Competition on Managing Information to Improve Competitiveness (with Elliot Maltz)
- 1991 Nominated for University Graduate Teaching Excellence Award by the Marketing Department
- 1989 First Prize, Marketing Science Institute Research Competition on Brand Equity
- 1989 Nominated for College of Business Research Excellence Award by the Marketing Department
- 1985 Alpha Kappa Psi Award, by the American Marketing Association for 1984 Journal of Marketing article judged to contribute most to the practice of marketing
- 1985 Nominated for University Graduate Teaching Excellence Award by the Marketing Department
- 1985 Cited as among the top 20 contributors to Marketing Journals (Journal of Marketing Education)
- 1985 Nominated for College of Business Research Excellence Award by the Marketing Department
- 1984 Cited as among the top 20 contributors to the Association for Consumer Research Conferences
- 1972 Merit Award, Association of Mechanical Engineers (India)
- 1967–72 Merit Scholarship/Fellowship – Indian Institute of Technology, Kanpur
- 1967 National Science Talent Search Scholarship (India)

== Teaching awards and recognitions ==
- Nominated (by SMU Students) for the Best MBA Elective Professor - Brand Management (2009)
- Executive-MBA Award for Most Relevant Seminar - Strategic Performance Management (2007)
- Co-chair for Best University-Wide Doctoral Dissertation at The University of Texas (Thesis—Goutam Challagalla; Co-chair—Dr. Tassu Shervani)
- Organized a team of students (BBA, MBA, and Advertising candidates) to enter the 1982 General Motors Intercollegiate Competition. The project required the development of a Marketing/Advertising campaign for the Oldsmobile Cutlass Diesel automobile. The University of Texas team placed second, nationwide. Professor Robert P. Leone was co-coordinator.
- Nominated the Joe D. Beasley Award (MBA Marketing Management Core Course) (1993 and 1994)
- Nominated by Marketing Department for University Level Graduate Teaching Award (for contributions to PhD Education) (1984, 1991 & 1992)
- Nominated by MBA students for "Outstanding (MBA) Core Professor," (Spring 1984, Spring 1987, Spring 1988).
- Teaching Excellence in Executive Programs (Runner-Up), UT-Austin (2002)
