= Ajay Kohli =

American marketing theorist

Ajay Kumar Kohli
- Known for: Market orientation
- Title: Gary T. and Elizabeth R. Jones Chair

Academic background
- Education: University of Pittsburgh; Indian Institute of Management Calcutta; Indian Institute of Technology Kharagpur
- Thesis: Determinants of Influence in Organizational Buying: A Contingency Perspective (1986)
- Doctoral advisor: Gerald Zaltman

Academic work
- Discipline: Marketing
- Institutions: Georgia Institute of Technology; Emory University; University of Texas at Austin

Ajay K. Kohli is the Gary T. and Elizabeth R. Jones Chair at Scheller College of Business, Georgia Institute of Technology. He is a former editor-in-chief of the Journal of Marketing. He is a fellow of the American Marketing Association.
