= Christine Moorman =

American business academic

- Title: T. Austin Finch Professor, Sr.

Academic background
- Education: University of Pittsburgh
- Thesis: The effects of stimulus-induced motivation and ability on the processing of nutrition information disclosures (1988)
- Doctoral advisor: Gerald Zaltman; C. Whan Park

Academic work
- Discipline: Marketing
- Institutions: Duke University; University of Wisconsin, Madison

Christine Moorman is the T. Austin Finch Professor, Sr. of Business Administration at Fuqua School of Business, Duke University. She is known for her work on marketing strategy, marketing organization and marketing research. She served as Editor-in-Chief of the Journal of Marketing. Dr. Moorman is the Founder and Director of The CMO Survey.

== Books ==
- Moorman, Christine and Donald R. Lehmann (ed.) (2004), Assessing Marketing Strategy Performance, Cambridge, MA: Marketing Science Institute.
- Moorman, Christine and George S. Day Strategy from the Outside In: Profiting from Customer Value. McGraw Hill, 2010.
- David A. Aaker and Christine Moorman (2023), Strategic Market Management, New York: John Wiley.

== Awards ==
- Irwin-McGraw Hill Distinguished Marketing Educator 2018, American Marketing Association.
