= Robert Ferber =

- Born: February 1922
- Died: September 8, 1981 (aged 59); Urbana, Illinois
- Title: Professor of Marketing

Academic background
- Education: City College of New York; University of Chicago; Columbia University

Academic work
- Discipline: Marketing
- Institutions: University of Illinois

Robert Ferber was an American marketing theorist, statistician, economist, and psychologist.

Ferber was a Professor of Business at the University of Illinois, the founding editor-in-chief of Journal of Marketing Research, and the second editor of Journal of Consumer Research. He is a former president of the American Marketing Association. The Ferber Award given to the best dissertation-based article published in the Journal of Consumer Research is named after him. He founded the Survey Research Laboratory (SRL) at University of Illinois. He was married to Marianne Ferber.

== Books and monographs ==
- Ferber, Robert. Handbook of Marketing Research. New York: McGraw-Hill, 1974.
- Ferber, Robert, and Hugh G. Wales. Motivation and Market Behavior. Homewood, Ill: R.D. Irwin, 1958.
- Ferber, Robert, and P J. Verdoorn. Research Methods in Economics & Business. New York: Macmillan, 1962.
- Ferber, Robert, and Werner Z. Hirsch. Social Experimentation and Economic Policy. Cambridge: Cambridge University Press, 1982.
- Ferber, Robert, and Hugh G. Wales. A Basic Bibliography on Marketing Research. Chicago: American Marketing Association, 1974.
