= ISBInsight =

- Editor: Dr Ashima Sood
- Categories: Research Periodical
- Frequency: Biannual
- Publisher: Indian School of Business
- Founded: 2003
- Website: ISBInsight.ISB.edu

ISBInsight is the biannual research periodical of the Indian School of Business (ISB). It features articles based on Indian and emerging markets-focused management research. ISBInsight also publishes interviews with thought leaders and decision makers from industry, academia, government and non-governmental organisations. It presents research across management areas such as strategy, marketing, information technology, accounting, behavioural studies, finance, economics and public policy.

== History ==
ISBInsight was launched in November 2003. Although it started off as a quarterly publication, it is currently released biannually in print. ISBInsight also releases a monthly newsletter called the Management Briefs. The first editor of the ISBInsight was Bhuvana Ramalingam(2003-2009), followed by Sriram Gopalakrishnan (2009-2012). Chitti Pantulu was Editor between 2014-16. Since 2017, Dr Ashima Sood has been the chief Editor of the periodical. The website for ISBInsight was launched in 2013.

The editorial board members include senior faculty members at the Indian School of Business. Dean Rajendra Srivastava, Siddharth Shekhar Singh, Milind Sohoni, Ramana Sonti, Sanjay Kallapur, Kavil Ramachandran, Deepa Mani, Subramaniam Ramnarayan and Chandrashekhar Sripada are members of the board.

== Contributions ==
Notable contributors to the ISBInsight include Raghuram Rajan, Amitava Chattopadhyay, Arvind Panagariya, S.P.Kothari, Vijay Govindarajan, Douglas W Diamond and Sunil Kant Munjal. Interviews with Adi Godrej, Narayanmurthy, Neeraj Arora, Peter Hansen, Thomas Schmidheiny, Viral Acharya, Utpal Bhattacharya, Kiran Bedi, M. M. Pallam Raju and Devi Shetty have been published in ISBInsight.

ISBInsight articles are regularly featured in leading publications including Forbes India, The Economist, Business Standard and Mint and Juggernaut Books, among others. ISBInsight draws its diverse and robust research resources from its unique academic centres with leading management and policy research institutes across the globe. ISBInsight has been cited and reproduced by NYU Scholars, National Bureau of Economic Research, Penn State University, Indian Institute of Science, ScienceDirect, Economic Times, Family Business United, IEDP and CEIB, among others.
