= Michael LaTour =

- Born: March 20, 1954; Colorado Springs, Colorado
- Died: November 8, 2015 (aged 61); Ithaca, New York
- Spouse: Kathryn LaTour (2002-2015; his death)

Academic background
- Education: BBA (1978); MBA (1981); Ph.D (1986)
- Alma mater: Boise State University; University of Mississippi
- Thesis: Arousal as an Intervening Variable in a Marketing Communications Context

Academic work
- Institutions: Ithaca College

Michael LaTour was an American marketing researcher, author and academic. He was a professor at Ithaca College.

LaTour's work explores psycho-physiological reactions to advertising stimuli as well as consumer memory in an advertising context. He published over 80 journal articles. His work has been published in the Journal of Consumer Research, Journal of Marketing, Journal of Advertising and Journal of Advertising Research.

== Early life and education ==
LaTour was born in Colorado and brought up in Colorado and San Jose. He received a BBA in 1978 and an MBA in 1981, both from Boise State University. He then joined the University of Mississippi, where he received a Ph.D. in Business Administration. His thesis was titled "Arousal as an Intervening Variable in a Marketing Communications Context."

== Career ==
In 1986, LaTour joined the Old Dominion University as an Assistant Professor of Marketing. He left Old Dominion University is 1991 and joined Auburn University as an associate professor, becoming professor in 1997. In 1999, he was endowed the Torchmark Chair in Marketing at Auburn University. While he was teaching at Auburn, he met Kathryn LaTour, whom he later married. LaTour joined the University of Nevada, Las Vegas in 2004 as a Professor of Marketing. He was also appointed as chair of the Marketing Department. From 2010 to 2013, he was a Beam Research Fellow at University of Nevada, Las Vegas.

In 2012, LaTour left University of Nevada, Las Vegas, and joined Cornell University as a visiting professor of marketing. He was also appointed as the Editor of Cornell Hospitality Quarterly and served from 2013–2015. In 2014, he was hired by Ithaca College as a professor of marketing.

=== Research and work ===
LaTour's work explores psycho-physiological reactions to advertising stimuli as well as consumer memory in an advertising context. In the beginning of his career, LaTour's research was focused on advertising, on how fear appeals can be used in advertising and the impact of female role portrayals in advertising. Throughout his career, his work remained focused on advertising. He wrote considerably about female nudity in advertisements, ethical concerns related to it, and the impact of arousal in advertisements. Towards early 2000s, his research in this area began focusing on how memories and false memories can impact the influence of advertising, and the long-term impact of consistent advertising on consumer memory.

During the early 1990s, some of LaTour's research dealt with the topics of ethics in organizations and sales management. In the mid 1990s, he conducted research on the perception of marital roles in purchase decisions.

Some of his work on healthcare marketing and social networking was published posthumously in late 2010s. LaTour often collaborated with his wife, Kathryn, on research and publications, related to wine, nostalgia, and taste. "The Michael LaTour Research Excellence Award" was established at Ithaca College in 2016 to help young research scholars.

== Awards and honors ==
- 1990 - Recipient of the Old Dominion University College of Business and Public Administration Outstanding Researcher of the Year Award
- 1996 - Co-author of the Best Paper in the Global/International Marketing Track of the A.M.A. Summer Educators’ Conference
- 1997 - Co-author of the Best Paper in the International/Global Marketing Track of the Southern Marketing Conference
- 1997 - Awarded the Auburn University Panhellenic Teaching award for Spring/Fall Quarters
- 1998 - Recipient of the Alabama Association for Higher Education in Business Award for Excellence and Professional Contributions
- 1998 - Co-author of the Best Paper in the Consumer Behavior Track of the A.M.A. Summer Educators’ Conference
- 2000/2002 - Recipient of a Distinguished Alumni of the Year Awards from Boise State University Alumni Association
- 2000 - Selected as a Boardman Invited Lecturer (with honorarium), College of Business, University of Southern Mississippi, Spring
- 2001 - Co-author of the Best Paper in the Advertising Track of the Society for Marketing Advances Conference
- 2003 - Selected as a Hearin Invited Lecturer, School of Business Administration, University of Mississippi
- 2007 - Recipient of the UNLV College of Business Outstanding Researcher of the Year Award
- 2010 - Recipient of the Beam Research Fellow Award UNLV College of Business.
- 2010 - Recipient of the UNLV College of Business Outstanding Researcher of the Year Award
- 2013 - Co-recipient of the Advertising Research Foundation Great Mind Award, for the best article appearing in the Journal of Advertising Research by academic authors
- 2014 - Co-author of the best article of the year for the Journal of Advertising.

== Selected publications ==
- LaTour, Michael and Tony L. Henthorne "Ethical Judgements of Sexual Appeals in Print Advertising" Journal of Advertising Vol. 23 No. 3, 1994; 81-90
- LaTour, Michael S., and Herb Rotfeld "There are Threats and (Maybe) Fear: Theory and Confusions of Appeals to Fear and Fear Itself" Journal of Advertising, Vol. 26, No. 3, 1997; 45-59
- Holbrook, Morris B., Kathleen T. Lacher and Michael S. LaTour, "Audience Judgments As the Potential Missing Link Between Expert Judgments and Audience Appeal: An Illustration Based on Musical Recordings of “My Funny Valentine" Journal of the Academy of Marketing Science Vol. 34, No. 1, 2006, 8-18
- LaTour, Kathryn, Michael S. LaTour, and Charles Brainerd, "Fuzzy Trace Theory and "Smart"False Memories: Implications for Advertising," Journal of Advertising Vol. 43, No. 1, 2014, 3-17
- Merchant, Altaf, Kathryn A. LaTour, John B. Ford and Michael S. LaTour, “How Strong is the Pull of the Past? Measuring Personal Nostalgia Evoked by Advertising,” Journal of Advertising Research, Vol. 53, No. 2, 2013, 150–165.
- LaTour, Michael. S. From the Editor: Why We Must Persevere in the Pursuit of the Best Academic Research: A Lesson from "Angel," Cornell Hospitality Quarterly, 2015
- LaTour, Kathryn A., and Michael S. LaTour, "Bridging Aficionados Perceptual and Conceptual Knowledge to Enhance how They Learn from Experience", Journal of Consumer Research, Vol. 37, No. 4, 2010, 688-697
- Braun-LaTour, Kathryn A., Michael S. LaTour, and George M. Zinkhan, "Using Childhood Memories to Gain Insight into Brand Meaning," Journal of Marketing Vol. 71, No. 2, 2007, 45-60
- Khrushchev, Sergei, Tony L. Henthorne and Michael S. LaTour, "Cuba at the Crossroads: The Role of the U.S. Hospitality Industry in Cuban Tourism Initiatives," (case study) Cornell Hotel and Restaurant Administration Quarterly Vol. 48, No. 4, 2007, 402-415
- Braun-LaTour, Kathryn, Michael S. LaTour, and Elizabeth Loftus, "Is that a Finger in My Chili? Using Affective Advertising for Post-Crisis Brand Repair," Cornell Hotel and Restaurant Administration Quarterly Vol. 47, No. 2, 2006, 106-120
