= Lusch =

Lusch is a German surname. Notable people with the surname include:

- Christian Lusch (born 1981), German sport shooter
- Michael Lusch (born 1964), German footballer and manager
- Robert Lusch (1949–2017), American academic

== See also ==
- Busch (surname)
