= Roland Rust =

Professor

Roland Rust is an American business professor, author and consultant.

== Professional background and accomplishments ==
Rust is a distinguished university professor and holds the David Bruce Smith chair in Marketing at the Smith School of Business, and the University of Maryland, College Park. He is the first business professor to be named a distinguished university professor at Maryland. He is one of two people to have been named a fellow of the American Marketing Association and the European Marketing Academy.

He founded the annual Frontiers in Service Conference as well as the Journal of Service Research. He is Executive Director of the Center for Excellence in Service and the Center for Complexity in Business. He holds a visiting position at Erasmus University and is an International Research Fellow at Oxford University. His lifetime achievement honors include the AMA Irwin McGraw-Hill Distinguished Marketing Educator Award, inaugural Fellow of the AMA, INFORMS Society for Marketing Science Fellow, the Converse Award, the Distinguished Marketing Educator Award from the Academy of Marketing Science.

His articles and books span the fields of marketing, service management, advertising, psychology, sociology, computer science, information systems, engineering, operations research, and management. He is a former editor of the Journal of Marketing and the Journal of Service Research and is currently Editor of the International Journal of Research in Marketing (IJRM). He has a global consulting practice, and comments on service issues on television, radio, and in the press.

== Education and positions held ==
Rust earned a BA in Mathematics (Phi Beta Kappa) at DePauw University, and an MBA and Ph.D. in Business Administration at the University of North Carolina, Chapel Hill. He served on the faculty of the University of Texas at Austin and Vanderbilt University before coming to Maryland.
