= Rajdeep Grewal =

Indian professor of Marketing

Rajdeep S. Grewal
- Title: Townsend Family Distinguished Professor of Marketing
- Awards: Mahajan Award for Lifetime Contributions to Marketing Strategy Research

Academic background
- Education: University of Cincinnati; Indian Institute of Management Lucknow; Indian Institute of Technology Delhi
- Thesis: (1998)

Academic work
- Discipline: Marketing
- Institutions: University of North Carolina at Chapel Hill; Pennsylvania State University; Washington State University
- Doctoral students: Ruby Lee, Girish Mallapragada, Rui Wang, Anindita Chakravarty, Alok Saboo, Mahima Hada, Tojin Eapen, Huanhuan Shi, Aditya Gupta, Charles Kang, Chen Zhou, Manpreet Gill, Khimendra Singh, Guneet Nagpal
- Website: https://www.kenan-flagler.unc.edu/faculty/directory/marketing/rajdeep-grewal

Rajdeep 'Raj' Grewal is the Townsend Family Distinguished Professor of Marketing at Kenan-Flagler Business School, University of North Carolina at Chapel Hill. He is the editor-in-chief of Journal of Marketing Research. He is known for his work on marketing research, marketing strategy and business to business marketing.

== Research ==
Grewal has used quantitative methods to theoretically and empirically study social networks and interactions, competitive strategy and the role of marketing within an organization. His work has been published in Journal of Marketing, Journal of Marketing Research, Marketing Science, Information Systems Research, Strategic Management Journal, Decision Sciences and Management Science.

In 2016, Grewal was given the AMA Marketing Strategy SIG's 2016 Mahajan Award for lifetime contributions to Marketing Strategy research. Grewal and his coauthors of "The Chief Marketing Officer Matters!" were honored with the Sheth Foundation/Journal of Marketing Award in 2020

== Books ==
- Lilien, Gary L., and Rajdeep Grewal, eds. Handbook on business to business marketing. Edward Elgar Publishing, 2012.

== Selected publications ==
- Kang, Charles, Frank Germann, and Rajdeep Grewal. "Washing away your sins? Corporate social responsibility, corporate social irresponsibility, and firm performance." Journal of Marketing 80, no. 2 (2016): 59-79.
- Germann, Frank, Peter Ebbes, and Rajdeep Grewal. "The chief marketing officer matters!." Journal of Marketing 79, no. 3 (2015): 1-22.
- Ebbes, Peter, John C. Liechty, and Rajdeep Grewal. "Attribute-level heterogeneity." Management Science 61, no. 4 (2014): 885-897.
- Grewal, Rajdeep, James A. Dearden, and Gary L. Lilien. "The university rankings game: Modeling the competition among universities for ranking." The American Statistician 62, no. 3 (2008): 232-237.
- DeSarbo, Wayne S., and Rajdeep Grewal. "An alternative efficient representation of demand‐based competitive asymmetry." Strategic Management Journal 28, no. 7 (2007): 755-766.
- DeSarbo, Wayne S., and Rajdeep Grewal. "Hybrid strategic groups." Strategic Management Journal 29, no. 3 (2008): 293-317.
- Grewal, Rajdeep, Gary L. Lilien, and Girish Mallapragada. "Location, location, location: How network embeddedness affects project success in open source systems." Management Science 52, no. 7 (2006): 1043-1056.
- DeSarbo, Wayne S., Rajdeep Grewal, and Jerry Wind. "Who competes with whom? A demand‐based perspective for identifying and representing asymmetric competition." Strategic Management Journal 27, no. 2 (2006): 101-129.
- Ding, Min, Rajdeep Grewal, and John Liechty. "Incentive-aligned conjoint analysis." Journal of marketing research 42, no. 1 (2005): 67-82.
- Grewal, Rajdeep, Joseph A. Cote, and Hans Baumgartner. "Multicollinearity and measurement error in structural equation models: Implications for theory testing." Marketing Science 23, no. 4 (2004): 519-529.
- Grewal, Rajdeep, Raj Mehta, and Frank R. Kardes. "The timing of repeat purchases of consumer durable goods: The role of functional bases of consumer attitudes." Journal of Marketing Research 41, no. 1 (2004): 101-115.
- Grewal, Rajdeep, and Ravi Dharwadkar. "The role of the institutional environment in marketing channels." Journal of Marketing 66, no. 3 (2002): 82-97.
- Grewal, Rajdeep, and Patriya Tansuhaj. "Building organizational capabilities for managing economic crisis: The role of market orientation and strategic flexibility." Journal of marketing 65, no. 2 (2001): 67-80.
- Grewal, Rajdeep, James M. Comer, and Raj Mehta. "An investigation into the antecedents of organizational participation in business-to-business electronic markets." Journal of Marketing 65, no. 3 (2001): 17-33.
