= Wayne DeSarbo =

Wayne DeSarbo is the Mary Jean and Frank P. Smeal Distinguished Professor of Marketing at the Smeal College of Business at Pennsylvania State University at University Park and executive director the Center for Sports Business and Research. He is known for his work on multidimensional scaling, and multivariate statistics in relation to marketing research. He is a fellow of the American Statistical Association.

== Awards ==
- Raymond B. Cattell Early Career Research Award
- Charles Coolidge Parlin Marketing Research Award

== Selected publications ==
- Fong, Duncan KH, Sunghoon Kim, Zhe Chen, and Wayne S. DeSarbo. "A Bayesian Multinomial Probit Model for the Analysis of Panel Choice Data." Psychometrika 81, no. 1 (2016): 161–183.
- Lenk, Peter J., and Wayne S. DeSarbo. "Bayesian inference for finite mixtures of generalized linear models with random effects." Psychometrika 65, no. 1 (2000): 93–119.
- Jedidi, Kamel, Harsharanjeet S. Jagpal, and Wayne S. DeSarbo. "Finite-mixture structural equation models for response-based segmentation and unobserved heterogeneity." Marketing Science 16, no. 1 (1997): 39–59.
- DeSarbo, Wayne S., Rajdeep Grewal, and Jerry Wind. "Who competes with whom? A demand‐based perspective for identifying and representing asymmetric competition." Strategic Management Journal 27, no. 2 (2006): 101–129.
- Oliver, Richard L., and Wayne S. DeSarbo. "Response determinants in satisfaction judgments." Journal of consumer research 14, no. 4 (1988): 495–507.
- DeSarbo, Wayne S., and William L. Cron. "A maximum likelihood methodology for clusterwise linear regression." Journal of classification 5, no. 2 (1988): 249–282.
- DeSarbo, Wayne S., J. Douglas Carroll, Linda A. Clark, and Paul E. Green. "Synthesized clustering: A method for amalgamating alternative clustering bases with differential weighting of variables." Psychometrika 49, no. 1 (1984): 57–78.
- DeSarbo, Wayne S. "GENNCLUS: New models for general nonhierarchical clustering analysis." Psychometrika 47, no. 4 (1982): 449–475.
- Arabie, Phipps, J. Douglas Carroll, Wayne S. DeSarbo, and Yoram Jerry Wind. "Overlapping clustering: A new method for product positioning." (1981).
