= Donald Lehmann =

American business professor

Donald R. Lehmann
- Born: October 16, 1944
- Died: December 23, 2025 (aged 81)

Academic background
- Education: Purdue University; Union College
- Thesis: Choice Among Similar Alternatives: An Application of a Model of Individual Preference to the Selection of Television Shows by Viewers (1969)
- Doctoral advisor: Frank Bass

Academic work
- Discipline: Marketing
- Institutions: Columbia University

Donald R. Lehmann (October 16, 1944 – December 23, 2025) was the George E. Warren Professor of Business Professor at Columbia Business School. A Fellow of the American Marketing Association, he was known for his work on choice and decision making, innovation, and new product development.

Lehmann received his BA from Union College, and his doctorate from Purdue University in 1969. His doctoral thesis "Choice among similar alternatives: an application of a model of individual preference to the selection of television shows by viewers" was written under the supervision of Frank Bass.

== Selected works ==
- Lehmann, Donald R., and Russell S. Winer. Analysis for Marketing Planning. Boston: McGraw-Hill, 1991, 1997, 2009. ISBN 9780071263634
  - Translated into Japanese by Takamichi Inoue as マーケティング計画 : 立案手法入門 / Māketingu keikaku: ritsuan shuhō nyūmon. Tōkyō: Bunshindō, 1991. ISBN 9784830940514
  - Translated into Chinese as Analysis for marketing planning = 营销策划分析 / Ying xiao ce hua fen xi. Beijing: Beijing da xue chu ban she, 2007.ISBN 9787301112137
  - Translated into Spanish as Investigación y análisis de mercado. México: Compañía Editorial Continental, 1998.
- Product Managers Marketing Plan 产品经理的营销计划 /Chan pin jing li de ying xiao ji hua / Product manager's marketing plan / Donald R. Lehmann, Russell S. Winer. Beijing: Yu hang chu ban she, 1999.
- Lehmann, Donald R., and Russell S. Winer. Product management. Maidenhead: McGraw-Hill Education, 2001, 2004. ISBN 9780071238328
  - Translated into Chinese as: 产品管理 : 第4版 / Chan pin guan li. Beijing: Beijing da xue chu ban she, 2006.ISBN 9787301096901
- Lehmann, Donald R., Sunil Gupta, and Joel H. Steckel. 'Marketing Research. Reading, MA: Addison-Wesley, 1998. ISBN 9780321014160
- Lehmann, Donald R., and Katherine E. Jocz. Reflections on the Futures of Marketing: Practice and Education. Cambridge, MA: Marketing Science Institute, 1997. ISBN 9780965711401
