= Runki Goswami =

Indian musician

- Born: 12 June 1978 (age 48); Asansol, West Bengal
- Genres: Khayal, Folk, Bhajan's, Thumri's, Light
- Occupations: Corporate music director, singer
- Instruments: Vocal and harmonium
- Years active: 2011–present
- Website: Official website of Runki Goswami
- Education: ISB Hyderabad

Runki Goswami is an Indian classical singer and composer who sings in 17 different Indian languages, also a Telugu music director.

== Early life and career ==
Runki Goswami was born in Asansol, West Bengal, on 12 June 1978. Her formal training started at the age of 3. She is trained in the Dilli and Chandigarh Gharana from Prayag Sangeet Samiti. She did her executive management from ISB Hyderabad and a Masters in Communication and Journalism.

Runki Goswami started her professional music career with a private Bengali Devotional album – Debobeena. The lyrics were written by her father, Dr. Malay Kumar Laik which she composed, directed and sung. The album was released Pan India by Keerthana music. Following this, she was the music director for two Telugu films, writer, Thedavaste fighter and Trivikraman.

She is also a proponent of reviving Indian Ragas as an alternative therapy. She is working on projects with medical practitioners to create an awareness of Indian Raga therapy to help heal patients from chronic diseases like asthma, spine issues, and stomach problems. Her articles on Raga Therapy have generated curiosity about this traditional Indian Raga therapy.

In 2018, Runki performed at Indian High Commission in London and represents India. She had sung in 17 languages.

== Soundtracks ==
=== Non films ===
The following songs were sung by Runki Goswami.

- Debobeena
- Manmarziyan
- Esho Devi
- Teen Maar Beatulakki
- Ni andelasandarilo
- Teen maar beatulakki
- kabhie ajnabi thi
- Ab naahi chanda
- Loomba Jhoomba
- Luk Chhip
- Kesariya Baalam
- Rangi Saari
- Saiya mile
- Bhedu Paako
- Morni

=== Films ===
- Thedavaste Fighter (Writer)
- Trivikraman

== Cultural performances ==
=== National ===
- Ghazal Evening, Ode to Farida Khanum: Lamakaan – Hyderabad, 2016
- Tribute to Geeta Dutt – India Habitat Centre, 2016
- Tribute to Farida Khanum – Epicentre, Gurgaon, Haryana, 2016
- Heirloom Collection of Indian Folk – India International Centre, 2017
- Tribute to Salil Choudhary, India Habitat Centre, 2017
- Tribute to O.P. Nayyar, India Habitat Centre, 2018
- Raga to depict moods and Seasons in Bollywood – India Habitat Centre, 2019

=== International ===
- Folk Tour of India – Heirloom Collection of Indian Folk – Nehru Centre, London – 2018
