= Namrata Brar =

Indian-American journalist

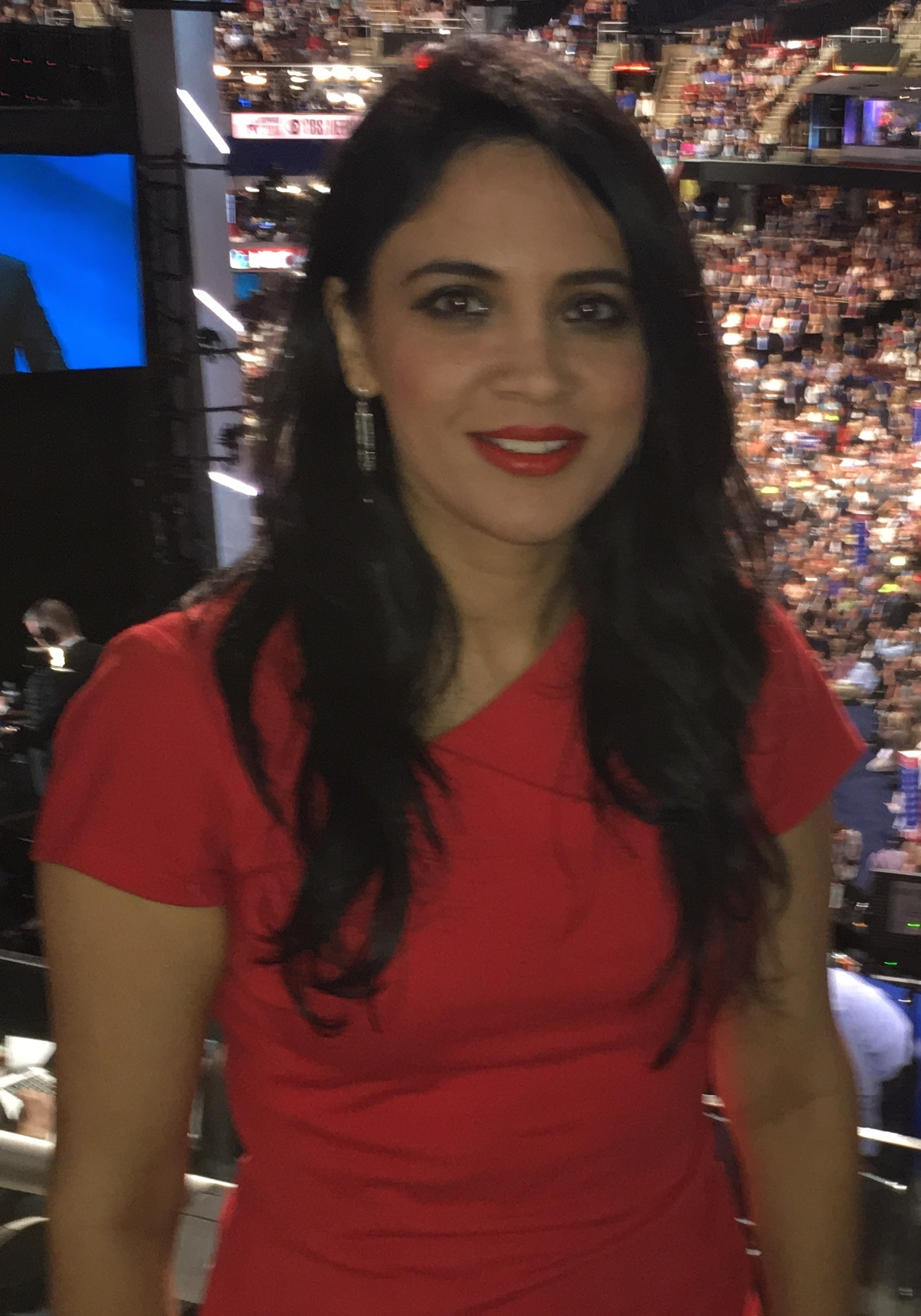
- Brar in 2016
- Education: Lady Sri Ram College; Indian School of Business
- Occupations: Journalist and TV Anchor
- Employer: NDTV

Namrata Brar is an Indian-American journalist, investigative reporter and news anchor. She is the former US Bureau Chief for NDTV. Brar is the great-grand-niece of noted Hungarian-Indian painter Amrita Sher-Gil. She has covered 2016 United States presidential election and was involved in a diplomatic incident between Pakistan and India during a press conference held in the United States by the Pakistani Foreign Secretary.

== Early life and education ==
Brar was born and raised in New Delhi. She graduated from Lady Sriram College, Delhi University. She also obtained an MBA from the Indian School of Business, Hyderabad. She moved to New York in 2009.

== Career ==
Namrata started her journalism career with NDTV Profit as Senior Anchor in 2005 and hosted programs, including Countdown and Opening Bell. She later rose to the Bureau Chief, USA and moved to New York.

She has covered stories, including President Elect Trump's India policy, the Devyani Khobragade case, the Sig Sauer $1 Billion Arms deal Scam and India-Pakistan diplomatic fallout post the Uri terror Attacks.

While covering the events of the Pakistani Prime Minister’s visit to the UN in 2016, she emerged as a figure, when being an Indian Journalist she was stopped from attending the press conference held by Aizaz Ahmad Chaudhry, the Pakistani Foreign Secretary, causing a diplomatic incident between Pakistan and India.

== See also ==
- List of Indian journalists
