= Nipun Malhotra (social entrepreneur) =

Indian social entrepreneur and disability rights activist

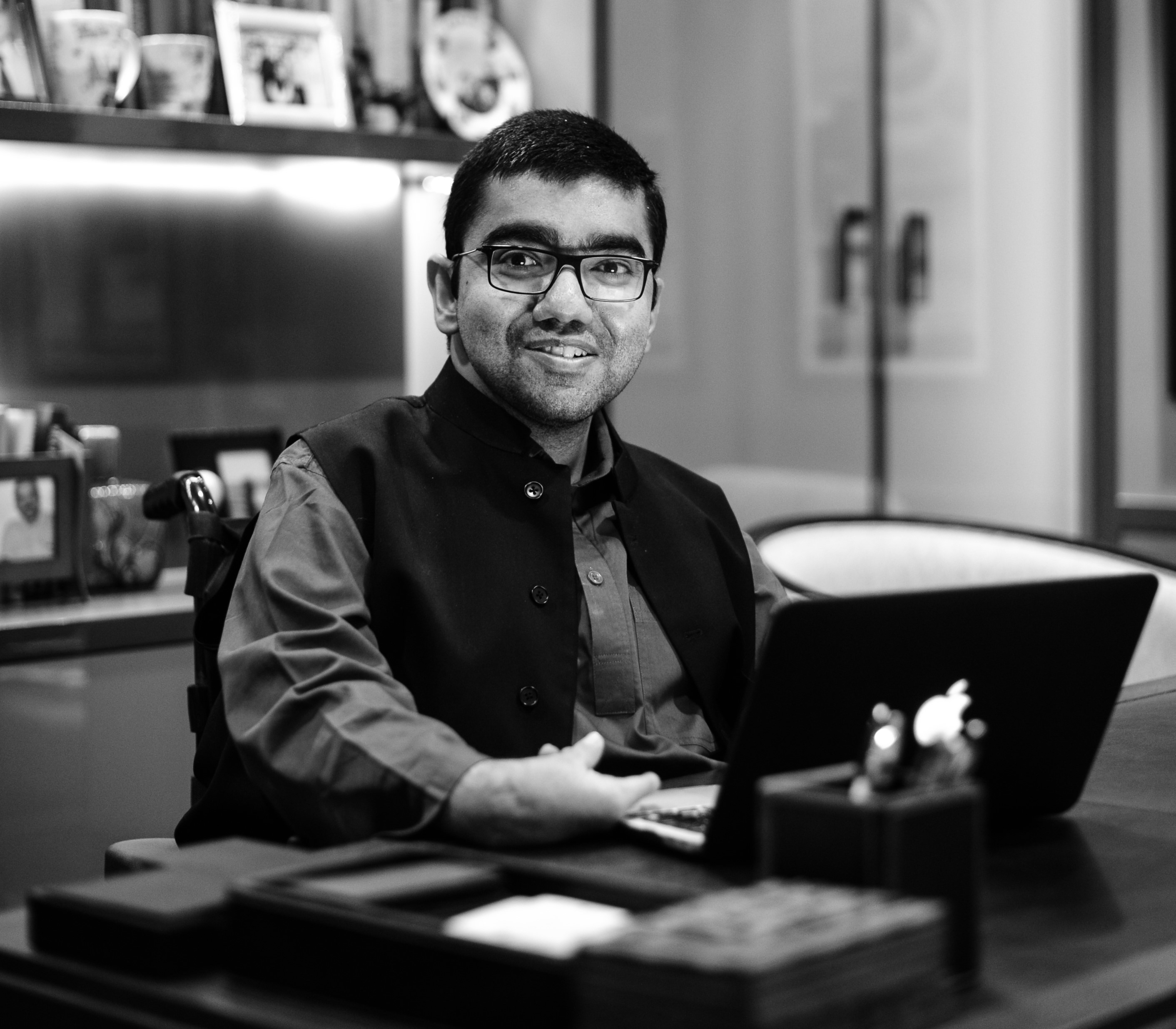
- Born: 1 September 1987 (age 38)
- Education: St.Stephen's College, Delhi; Delhi University; Delhi School of Economics; Indian School of Business
- Organization: Nipman Foundation
- Known for: Disability activism

Nipun Malhotra (born 1 September 1987) is an Indian social entrepreneur and disability rights activist. He was born in Mumbai, Maharashtra, with arthrogryposis. In 2012, he started a disability rights advocacy organization based in Delhi called Nipman Foundation. Malhotra is the Founder Chair of Federation of Indian Chambers of Commerce & Industry's (FICCI) Diversity & Inclusion Working Group on Empowering Persons with Disability.

== Education ==
Malhotra studied economics at St. Stephen's College, Delhi University and Delhi School of Economics. He later attended the Indian School of Business.

== Advocacy Work ==
=== Delhi Odd-Even rule exemption ===
Malhotra filed a writ petition in the Delhi High Court in December 2015 seeking exemption of private vehicles of Persons with Disabilities (PwDs) from the Odd-Even rule. Under this rule, vehicles with registration numbers ending in odd numbers are allowed on the roads on only odd days and even-numbered vehicles are allowed on the roads on only even days. The rule was announced to be introduced in Delhi in 2016 to reduce pollution and smog. However, the private vehicles of PwDs are generally retrofitted to meet their needs and due to lack of accessible infrastructure and accessible public transport, PwDs could only have moved out on alternate days. His petition led to an exception being carved out for PwDs and a status check on disability audit of Government buildings and the infrastructure retrofitting done by the Government to check how accessible Delhi was for Persons with Disabilities.

=== Low-floor accessible buses ===
As a result of Malhotra's writ petition in the Supreme Court of India, the Government of Delhi was directed to only buy low-floor buses in Delhi. The government had taken a decision on 1 September 2017 to induct 2,000 standard-floor buses. The petition challenged Delhi government and the Delhi Transport Corporation's (DTC) decision to buy 2,000 standard-floor buses instead of low-floor buses for the national capital. On 5 August 2019, the Supreme Court ruled in favour of mandating low-floor buses in Delhi.

=== Insurance and congenital anomalies ===
The writ petition asked the Government of India to direct Insurance Regulatory and Development Authority of India (IRDAI) and insurance companies to remove congenital anomalies from the list of general exclusions in the health or life insurance policies. IRDAI had been denying the rights of Persons with Disabilities (PwDs) to seek insurance cover for themselves on the ground that their conditions were categorized under the scope of "congenital anomalies", which was allowed as an exception to granting insurance.

=== GST on disability aids and assistive devices ===
The Goods and Services Tax (GST) on Braille typewriters and papers, carriages for disabled people, wheelchairs and other assistive devices was fixed at rates of 5–18%. This was claimed by some to be equivalent to a tax on walking or seeing. The GST rate on all mobility and disability aids across India has now been reduced from 18% to 5% after the 16th GST council meeting. However, the petition aims for a zero-rated GST, with a special refund scheme for input tax credit. This means that the entire value chain of the supply should be exempt from tax. Under this regime, not only is the final output exempt from payment of tax, the input for making/providing the output supply is exempted too.

=== Indian Sign Language (ISL) recognition ===
In order to recognize Indian Sign Language as the 23rd official language of India, Malhotra filed a writ petition in the Delhi High Court. ISL gives an identity to the deaf community and is the only language they use to communicate. The issue was submitted for the consideration of the central government and they took notice of the matter. The quest to formalise Indian Sign Language gained momentum after this petition. The government in power committed to spend more resources on the Indian Sign Language Research and Training Centre. For the first time ever, the Communist Party of India (Marxist) released a 12-minute video explaining the highlights of the party's manifesto in sign language for the 2019 Indian general election and the largest opposition party in India, Indian National Congress, promised to recognize Indian Sign Language in their national election manifesto.

=== Zomato's disabled-friendly filter ===
There were not too many restaurants in Delhi and other Indian cities that advertised themselves as disabled-friendly. Malhotra was denied entry at Keya, located in DLF Promenade Mall in Vasant Kunj in March 2015 because "as a 'policy', the restaurant did not allow entry to disabled persons". Protests by disability-rights groups forced the Aam Aadmi Party government to order a magisterial inquiry into the incident. Malhotra contacted executives at the Zomato restaurant review and delivery website in August 2015 and suggested introducing a feature that could filter "disabled-friendly" restaurants. The idea was welcomed by them. The filter was added to the Zomato app in six metropolitan areas – Delhi, Mumbai, Bangalore, Hyderabad, Kolkata and Chennai.

=== X-ray scanning in airport security ===
After being harassed and mocked by the Central Industrial Security Force (CISF) officer on duty at the Bangalore Airport on 30 November 2016, Malhotra, along with some other disability activists, lobbied with CISF to ease security procedures for PwDs at airports. There had been multiple similar reported instances from across the country. On 11 October 2017, the Bureau of Civil Aviation Security (BCAS) allowed using X-ray scanning for prosthetics and orthotics only as a measure of last resort. It was decided that checking of PwDs with a hand-held explosives trace detector (ETD) device would suffice and X-ray screening would only be used in cases of "sufficient doubt." Instructions were also issued to make wheelchair users get up from their wheelchairs only in exceptional cases for security checks.

== Nipman Foundation Microsoft Equal Opportunity Awards ==
The Equal Opportunity Awards were instituted in 2014 to recognize organizations and individuals making significant contributions to people with disabilities in their workspace and lifestyles.

The reason for starting the Awards was to encourage more companies to hire persons with disabilities. In 2016, Microsoft came on board as the title partner for the Awards. In the sixth edition of the Nipman Foundation Microsoft Equal Opportunity Awards in 2019, awards were given in seven categories: Technological Innovations Empowering PwDs, Non-technological Innovations Empowering PwDs, Companies Hiring PwDs, Inclusive and Integrated Schools, Physical Accessibility Promoting Universal Design, Entrepreneur with a Disability, and Professional with a Disability

== Wheels For Life ==
Malhotra is the founder of Wheels for Life - a crowdsourcing platform connecting those who need wheelchairs to donors who can financially contribute for them. This initiative was started in October 2016.

== Project Delhi ==
Malhotra co-founded Project Delhi in April 2020 for supporting Persons with Disabilities amidst the COVID-19 pandemic in India. The idea of Project Delhi was to help persons with disabilities procure essential items by offering contactless delivery of groceries and medicines. Those with mobility issues and high support needs were finding it difficult to step out for buying essentials, primarily groceries and medicines. Through Project Delhi, the volunteers signed up online and delivered these essentials to any disabled person at the MRP.
