= Robert Lusch =

American academic (1949–2017)

Robert Frank Lusch
- Born: Robert Frank Lusch; January 21, 1949; Grosse Point, Michigan, US
- Died: February 23, 2017 (age 68); Tucson, Arizona, US
- Resting place: Holy Hope Cemetery, Tucson, AZ
- Education: Ph.D. from University of Wisconsin-Madison, M.B.A. University of Arizona, B.B.A. University of Arizona
- Occupation: Professor
- Years active: 1975 to 2017
- Employer: University of Arizona
- Title: Lisle and Roslyn Payne, Professor of Marketing
- Website: Faculty biodata

Dr. Robert Frank Lusch (January 21, 1949 - February 23, 2017) was an American business professor and Professor of Marketing at the University of Arizona business school.

== Early life and education ==
Lusch was born in Grosse Point, Michigan, in 1949. As an adolescent Lusch moved with his mother, father, and two sisters to Tucson, Arizona. Lusch often claimed he "grew up in Arizona"; he graduated from Tucson High School and attended the University of Arizona where he received a bachelor's degree and an MBA. In 1975 he received his Ph.D. in Business Administration from the University of Wisconsin-Madison.

== Career ==
Robert Lusch graduated with his PhD from the University of Wisconsin-Madison in 1975 and started his academic career at the University of Oklahoma. After working at the University of Oklahoma for 26 years, including 5 years as the Dean of its business school (1987 to 1992), Lusch became the Dean of the M.J. Neeley School of Business at Texas Christian University in 2000. By that time, Lusch had written 14 books and published 150 articles in a variety of professional journals. Lusch's research has been published in the Journal of Marketing, Journal of Consumer Research, Journal of Marketing Research, Marketing Science, Journal of Retailing, Accounting, Organizations and Society, Sloan Management Review, Organizational Dynamics, IEEE Intelligent Systems, Journal of Operations Management, IBM Systems Journal, and Behavioral Science.

In 2004, Lusch became the head of the "marketing department at the University of Arizona's business school." Lusch served as the Executive Director of the McGuire Center for Entrepreneurship at the University of Arizona and holds the James and Pamela Muzzy Chair in Entrepreneurship. Professor Lusch has served as Vice President of Education, Vice President of Finance, Vice President of Publications, Chairperson of the American Marketing Association, and trustee of the American Marketing Association Foundation. He has advised and consulted with Adolph Coors, Arvest Bank, Cotter & Company, Household Finance, Ford Motor Company, Fleming Companies, National Association of Wholesalers, National Retail Hardware Association, Retail Floor Covering Institute, TG&Y, True Value, and Winn's Stores.

== Recognition ==
The National Retail Hardware Association awarded him the Hardware Industry Service Award (1976). The National Association of Accountants awarded him the Lybrand's Bronze Medal for contributions to accounting literature (1979). The Academy of Marketing Science awarded him in 1997 its Distinguished Marketing Educator Award, and the American Marketing Association has twice (1997 and 2005) presented him the Harold Maynard Award for contributions to marketing theory, and he is also the recipient of the AMA Louis Stern Award for contributions to the Marketing Channels' literature (2002). The Marketing Management Association has honored him with the Creative Career Contributions in Marketing award (2006). In 2009 the AMA awarded him its IOSIG Lifetime Achievement Award, and in 2010 he was the recipient of the AMA/Sheth Foundation Award for long-standing contributions to marketing literature. In February 2013 Lusch was presented the AMA/Irwin/McGraw-Hill Distinguished Marketing Educator Award.

== Personal life ==
Lusch was married to Virginia Lusch and had two biological children, Mark Lusch and Stephen Lusch. He also adopted Virginia’s daughter, Heather. Lusch died from bladder cancer.
