= Richard Bagozzi =

American marketing theorist and Dwight F

Richard Paul Bagozzi
- Born: March 6, 1946 (age 80); Detroit, Michigan
- Education: BSEE; MS; MBA; MA; PhD
- Alma mater: Kettering University; University of Colorado; Wayne State University; University of St. Thomas; Northwestern University
- Occupations: Behavioral and social scientist
- Scientific career
- Fields: Business management Psychology; Behavioral science Social science Health sciences
- Workplaces: University of Michigan
- Website: https://www.richardbagozzi.com/

Richard Paul Bagozzi is an Italian American behavioral and social scientist most known for his work in theory, methodology and empirical research. He is the Dwight F. Benton Professor Emeritus of Marketing at the University of Michigan.

Bagozzi's research is focused on understanding human action, particularly on the distinction between events happening to individuals and their control over events. His work examines individual, interpersonal, and group behaviors amid societal tensions like capitalism and socialism, studying subjects such as consumers, citizens, managers, healthcare professionals, and patients. His research spans the impact of actions on personal and societal well-being, using methods from social psychology and emotion research. He employs surveys, qualitative research, and experiments, often using structural equation models, and incorporates neuroscience techniques like fMRI, EEG, hormonal, and genetic research.

Across his career, Bagozzi has developed theoretical frameworks to examine how motivations, emotions, and cognitive processes interact to shape human behavior. His work integrates concepts from social psychology with empirical testing in marketing and organizational research. Many of his studies examine the relationship between internal psychological states and observable actions, particularly in contexts involving decision making and social interaction.

== Biography ==
Born in Detroit, Michigan in 1946, Bagozzi completed his undergraduate education in electromagnetic field theory at General Motors Institute (Kettering University) in 1970. He received an MS in Electrical Engineering and Applied Mathematics from the University of Colorado in 1969, followed by an MBA in General Business from Wayne State University in 1972. His PhD was awarded to him by Northwestern University in 1976, where he studied marketing, psychology, sociology, statistics, philosophy, and anthropology. In 2005, he earned an MA in theology from the University of St. Thomas, Houston.

His academic training combined engineering, mathematics, and the behavioral sciences, which influenced his interdisciplinary approach to research in marketing and social science. The combination of quantitative training and social science theory became a central feature of his later work in research methodology and theory development.

Bagozzi began his academic career in 1976 as an assistant professor at the University of California, Berkeley, then became an associate professor at the Massachusetts Institute of Technology (MIT) in 1979, and afterward moved to Stanford University as an associate professor in 1983. Following this, he became a full professor at the University of Michigan in 1986, where he stayed for 33 years, before retiring in 2023. During his time at Michigan, he went away for 6 years to Rice University to help the Provost Gilbert Whitaker in building the school of management.

Bagozzi conducted research and taught courses focused on consumer behavior, marketing theory, and research methods. His work during this period contributed to the development of behavioral approaches within marketing research and integrated perspectives from psychology and sociology into the study of markets and organizations.

Bagozzi has received teaching awards including the Undergraduate School of Business Award (1977-1978) and the University-wide Outstanding Teaching Award, both from the University of California, Berkeley (1978), along with the Outstanding Ph.D. Teaching Award from the University of Michigan (1994, 1998). He is a Fellow of the American Marketing Association, the Association for Consumer Research, the Association for Psychological Science, the Society of Multivariate Experimental Psychology, and the Michigan Society of Fellows.

Bagozzi was a Senior Fulbright Hays Research Scholar in Germany (1981-1982) and is the recipient of honorary doctorates from the University of Lausanne, Switzerland (2001), Antwerp University, Belgium (2008), and the Norwegian School of Economics (2011). He was awarded the Medal of Science by the University of Bologna, Italy (2013), and was ranked among the top 1% most cited researchers in economics and business between 2002 and 2012 and in the World's Most Influential Scientific Minds in 2014 by Thomson Reuters.

== Work ==
Bagozzi has contributed to the fields of business – marketing, management and organizations, information science, ethics and corporate social responsibility – and in psychology, sociology, statistics, economics, and the health sciences. Much of this work is marked by empirical research grounded in integration of theory and measurement.

A central theme in Bagozzi’s scholarship is the relationship between theoretical concepts and empirical measurement. His research examines how psychological constructs such as emotions, desires, intentions, and identities can be conceptualized and tested using quantitative methods.

=== Marketing as (social) exchange ===
Bagozzi proposed marketing as a (social) exchange for the basis of the field. In 2018, he added three systems or processes to marketing as an exchange to undergird its meaning: goal-directed behavior and self-regulation, neuroscience/genes/hormones, and the role of trust, competition, and cooperation in exchanges.

His work on marketing as exchange builds on earlier sociological and economic theories while examining the behavioral and psychological processes underlying transactions. This perspective considers marketing interactions as social relationships involving expectations, obligations, and mutual influence.

=== Consumer behavior ===
Introducing the notions of emotions, desires, the self-concept, and self-regulation into attitude theory, Bagozzi moved research from the dominant evaluative paradigm of the day to a more expansive conceptualization spanning subfields of psychology and drawing upon philosophical perspectives on desire. This work incorporated determinants of action such as trying to consume, social identity, anticipated emotions, desires and intentions, building on and extending the model of goal-directed behavior. Another aspect of his work in consumer behavior is his research on promotion/prevention focus and fit in health care decisions on the material self, and on conspicuous consumption.

=== Emotion in marketing ===
In the 1970s, Bagozzi introduced ideas and empirical research rooted in basic emotions and their cross-cultural differences, self-conscious emotions, moral emotions, and empathy. His work has explored the role of emotions in goal-directed actions, as well as anticipated and anticipatory senses, and can be found in studies of consumers, managers, patients, and healthcare workers.

=== Big concepts ===
Bagozzi argued that big ideas or big concepts (big data) are large conceptual schemes that are organized multidimensionally in either sequential or hierarchical structures. According to him, most theories and tests of hypotheses in consumer research and psychology use variables (independent, dependent, mediating, moderating) that are unidimensional and defined as singular concepts and measured with singular scales as averages of items. He showed that higher-order mental structures have capacities and functions not easily, if at all, reducible to the parts represented by lower-order factors or scales. His research further highlighted that hierarchical mental structures possess two general features: they represent subjective experiences, becoming integral to individuals' sense of self and their relationships with the world and others, and they wield explanatory power, functioning holistically as variables within broader theories, whether as independent, dependent, mediating, or moderating elements. As a result, he concluded that big concepts in these senses resemble emergent phenomena and hylomorphic phenomena described in philosophy. Examples include brand love, brand hate, brand coolness, and the material self.

=== Measurement and methodology ===
In Bagozzi's perspective, the classical consideration of ideas and theories significantly influences their measurement and study methodologies. In the holistic construal, he suggested a symbiosis between theory and method, where the measurement and testing of theories and ideas influence their perception. He analyzed this relationship through studies on construct validity and the philosophical underpinnings of measurement. His research on measurement and methodology has shown that construct validity poses special problems for artificial intelligence.

=== Neuroscience, genetics and hormones ===
Bagozzi proposed that biology constitutes an important framework for studying individual and interpersonal behavior and has made contributions in this area. He focused on the explanation of behavior of managers and consumers, by use of concepts and methods in neuroscience, genetics, and hormones.

=== Organizational behavior ===
Bagozzi has conducted a program of research with managers, primarily sales account managers. This has included work on the relationship between performance and satisfaction, sales call anxiety, and self-conscious emotions such as pride, shame and embarrassment. Much of his work in neuroscience, genetics, hormones, and other research has been in collaboration with sales managers. He has examined the concept of social identity in organizations and extended his contributions to measurement, methodology, neuroscience, genetics, and hormones to organizational behavior.

=== Corporate social responsibility ===
Bagozzi's program of research in moral behavior has examined offshoring, reshoring, digital piracy, corporate green actions, labor practices, business relations with the local community and contracts and relationships with other companies. His recent research looked into bribery, climate change and COVID-19.

=== Health sciences ===
Bagozzi has published in health journals to develop and test theories and to conduct substantive research. His work includes studies of blood donors, bone narrow donors, physician use of drug information sources, processing of drug information by elderly patients, body weight maintenance, decision making by pharmacy and therapeutics committees, self-regulation of hypertension, direct to consumer drug advertising, nutrition, hormone replacement therapy, blood glucose maintenance, and social disparities in diabetes medication adherence.

=== Happiness and well-being ===
Bagozzi's theory of happiness is grounded in goal directed behavior and self-regulation, as well as expressive behavior. He has utilized a holistic approach, and his theory incorporates first- and second-person processes with third person perspectives, and has biological, psychological, and social components.

== Awards and honors ==
- 1978 – University-wide Outstanding Teaching Award, University of California, Berkeley
- 1994, 1998 – Outstanding Ph.D. Teaching Award, University of Michigan
- 2013 – Medal of Science, University of Bologna
- 2014 – The World’s Most Influential Scientific Minds, Thomson Reuters

== Bibliography ==
=== Selected books ===
- Causal models in marketing (1980) ISBN 978-0471015161
- Philosophical and Radical Thought in Marketing (1987) ISBN 978-0669143010
- Marketing Management (1998) ISBN 978-0023051623
- Atteggiamento intenzioni comportamento (1999) ISBN 9788-846414519
- The Social Psychology of Consumer Behaviour (2002) ISBN 978-0335207220

=== Selected articles ===
- Bagozzi, R. P., & Yi, Y. (1988). On the evaluation of structural equation models. Journal of the academy of marketing science, 16, 74-94.
- Davis, F. D., Bagozzi, R. P., & Warshaw, P. R. (1989). User acceptance of computer technology: A comparison of two theoretical models. Management science, 35(8), 982-1003.
- Bagozzi, R. P., Yi, Y., & Phillips, L. W. (1991). Assessing construct validity in organizational research. Administrative science quarterly, 421-458.
- Davis, F. D., Bagozzi, R. P., & Warshaw, P. R. (1992). Extrinsic and intrinsic motivation to use computers in the workplace 1. Journal of applied social psychology, 22(14), 1111-1132.
- Bagozzi, R. P., Gopinath, M., & Nyer, P. U. (1999). The role of emotions in marketing. Journal of the academy of marketing science, 27(2), 184-206.
- Bagozzi, R. P., Mari, S., Oklevik, O., & Xie, C. (2023). Responses of the public towards the government in times of crisis. British Journal of Social Psychology, 62(1), 359-392.
