= Variety seeking =

Type of consumer behavior

Variety seeking or variety-seeking buying behavior describes consumers' desire to search for alternative products even if they are satisfied with a current product.

== Sources ==
- Simonson, Itamar. "The effect of purchase quantity and timing on variety-seeking behavior." Journal of Marketing Research (1990): 150-162.
- McAlister, Leigh, and Edgar Pessemier. "Variety seeking behavior: An interdisciplinary review." Journal of Consumer research 9, no. 3 (1982): 311-322.
- Kahn, Barbara E., and Alice M. Isen. "The influence of positive affect on variety seeking among safe, enjoyable products." Journal of Consumer Research 20, no. 2 (1993): 257-270.
- Van Trijp, Hans CM, Wayne D. Hoyer, and J. Jeffrey Inman. "Why switch? Product category: level explanations for true variety-seeking behavior." Journal of Marketing Research (1996): 281-292.
- McAlister, Leigh. "A dynamic attribute satiation model of variety-seeking behavior." Journal of Consumer Research 9, no. 2 (1982): 141-150.
- Van Trijp, Hans CM, and Jan-Benedict EM Steenkamp. "Consumers' variety seeking tendency with respect to foods: measurement and managerial implications." European Review of Agricultural Economics 19, no. 2 (1992): 181-195.

== See also ==
- Consumer innovativeness
