= George S. Day =

- Occupations: Academic (Management), Management consultant, Author, Director

George S. Day is an educator and consultant in the fields of strategic management, innovation and marketing. He is the Geoffrey T. Boisi Emeritus Professor at the Wharton School of the University of Pennsylvania. He founded the Mack Institute for Innovation Management at the Wharton School, where he is a Faculty Emeritus in Residence.

He is known for the concepts of market-driven strategy and organization, and the outside-in approach to strategy. With Paul Schoemaker, he introduced the concepts of peripheral vision of organizations and the vigilant leadership needed for greater foresight.

He has authored 185 articles and 21 books. His research and writings have been cited 70,000 times (with an h-index of 85), and he is ranked 109th in citations among all scholars in management and business in the US.

His research and consulting interests focus on competitive strategies in global markets, innovation management and organic growth leadership, marketing management, strategy processes, and organizational foresight and preparedness.

== Education ==
Day obtained a bachelor's degree in Applied Science from the University of British Columbia and an MBA with high distinction from the University of Western Ontario. He received a PhD degree from Columbia University in 1968.

== Career ==
George Day has taught at Stanford University, IMD (International Management Development Institute) in Lausanne, Switzerland, and the University of Toronto, and has held visiting appointments at MIT, the Harvard Business School, the London Business School, the Indian School of Business and the Singapore Management University. Prior to joining the Wharton School, he was Executive Director of the Marketing Science Institute, an industry-supported research consortium.

He is a past chairman of the American Marketing Association and currently serves as a director of the Zoological Society of Philadelphia and Returning Peace Corp Volunteers Ventures. He is presently the co-chair of the Ag Sustainability Center of the Sonoma County Winegrowers and a Trustee of the Marketing Science Institute. He has served on 14 for-profit and non-profit boards of directors.

He has directed and participated in senior executive programs in 20 countries, including the United States, Canada, England, Ireland, France, Switzerland, Germany, Japan, Singapore, South Africa, India, Brazil, Chile, Mexico, Australia, and New Zealand.

== Awards and honors ==
He has won ten best article awards and one best book prize, and two of his articles were among the 25 most influential articles in marketing science in the past 25 years. He was honored with the Harold H. Maynard Award in 1989, Charles Coolidge Parlin Award in 1994, the Paul D. Converse Award in 1996, the Mahajan Award for career contributions to strategy in 2001 and the William L. Wilkie, Marketing for a Better World award in 2017. In 2003 he received the AMA/McGraw-Hill Distinguished Marketing Educator Award. In 2011 he was chosen as one of eleven "Legends in Marketing," and in 2021 he was awarded the Sheth Medal for Exceptional Contributions to Marketing Scholarship and Practice.

== Bibliography ==
=== Books ===
- 1980 Marketing Research (with David Aaker)
- 1990 Market Driven Strategy: Processes for Creating Value
- 1997 Wharton on Dynamic Competitive Strategy (with David Reibstein)
- 1999 The Market Driven Organization: Understanding, Attracting and Keeping Valuable Customers
- 2000 Wharton on Managing Emerging Technologies (with Paul J. H. Schoemaker)
- 2006 Peripheral Vision: Detecting the Weak Signals that Will Make or Break Your Company (with Paul J. H. Schoemaker)
- 2010 Strategy from the Outside In (with Christine Moorman)
- 2013 Innovation Prowess: Leadership Strategies for Accelerating Growth
- 2019 See Sooner/Act Faster: How Vigilant Leaders Thrive in an Era of Digital Turbulence (with Paul Schoemaker)
- 2022 Advanced Introduction to Marketing Strategy
- 2025 Innovate to Grow: How to Achieve and Sustain Faster Growth
