= David Glen Mick =

David Glen Mick (born December 5, 1951) is the Robert Hill Carter Professor in Marketing in the McIntire School of Commerce at the University of Virginia. He is former editor of the Journal of Consumer Research (1999–2003), past President of the Association for Consumer Research (2005), and an elected fellow of the Society for Consumer Psychology. He is credited with being a co-founder in 2005 of Transformative Consumer Research at the Association for Consumer Research. In general, Mick's research has focused on the nature and role of meaning and communication in consumer behavior. More specifically, he has addressed semiotics and consumer behavior, consumer motivations, self-gifts, advertising, materialism, satisfaction, technological products, and, more recently, wisdom and well-being. Mick has been recognized for his research in varied ways. He was awarded the Best Article Award for 1986–1988 in the Journal of Consumer Research. He is also a recipient of the 1999 Harold H. Maynard Award for research in the Journal of Marketing. He has been ranked as one of the top 50 most prolific scholars (out of 2,257) in the leading marketing journals from 1982 to 2006. He has also been ranked as one of the top-10 most published consumer researchers in the Journal of Consumer Research for the 25-year period of 1977–2002. Mick has been invited to conduct seminars at universities across the world, including Harvard, Duke, Stanford, Oxford, Erasmus (Netherlands), Trinity (Ireland), and the Stockholm School of Economics, among others.

== Biography ==
David Glen Mick was born in Hammond, Indiana, and raised in Northwest Indiana,

He attended high school at Bishop Noll Institute, Hammond, Indiana. He then completed a B.S. degree, with double honors, in English and Philosophy in 1974, an M.A. degree in English in 1976 from the University of Texas at Austin, a master's degree in Health Care Administration in 1980 from the School of Medicine at Indiana University and He received his Ph.D. in marketing (with minors in Psychology and Semiotics) in 1987 from Indiana University, following, and

== Career ==
In the late 1970s through the mid-1980s, Mick worked in the health care management and marketing field, while holding adjunct faculty positions at the University of Indianapolis and Indiana University-Purdue University at Indianapolis. Following his doctoral work, he served as a marketing professor at the University of Florida (1987–1994) and the University of Wisconsin (1994–2000). In 2000 he joined the faculty at the University of Virginia. Mick has also been a visiting professor at the Copenhagen Business School (1989–1990), Dublin City University (1997–1998), and the University of Sydney (2004).

== Books ==
- Ratneswhar S., David Glen Mick, and Cynthia Huffman (2000), editors, The Why of Consumption: Contemporary Perspectives on Consumer Motives, Goals, and Desires, p. 330, ISBN 0-415-22095-5, OCLC 43930054 (http://uva.worldcat.org/title/why-of-consumption-contemporary-perspectives-on-consumer-motives-goals-and-desires/oclc/43930054&referer=brief_results
- Ratneshwar, S. and David Glen Mick (2005), editors, Inside Consumption: Consumer Motives, Goals, and Desires, London: Routledge, p. 356, ISBN 0-415-34193-0, OCLC 572434112 (http://uva.worldcat.org/title/inside-consumption-consumer-motives-goals-and-desires/oclc/57243412&referer=brief_results)
- Mick, David Glen, Simone Pettigrew, Cornelia Pechmann, and Julie L. Ozanne, editors, (2012), Transformative Consumer Research for Personal and Collective Well-Being, New York: Routledge/Taylor & Francis, p. 737, ISBN 978-1-84872-852-3, OCLC 741103541 (http://uva.worldcat.org/title/transformative-consumer-research-for-personal-and-collective-well-being/oclc/741103541&referer=brief_results)
