= Gary Lilien =

Gary L. Lilien is Distinguished Professor of Management Science at the Smeal College of Business at Pennsylvania State University and is also the co-founder and research director of Institute for the Study of Business Markets ISBM, the world's leading institution focusing on fostering research in B2B markets.

== Biography ==
Before joining Penn State University as a faculty member in 1981, Lilien was an assistant professor at the MIT Sloan School of Management. He has authored or co-authored twenty books, including the very popular Marketing Models with Phil Kotler and Sridhar Moorthy, Marketing Engineering with Arvind Rangaswamy and most recently, Principles of Marketing Engineering, with Arvind Rangaswamy and Arnaud De Bruyn. He has also published over 100 professional articles primarily in the areas of industrial marketing, new product development, marketing models, and bargaining theory. He was departmental editor for marketing for the journal, Management Science; is on the editorial board of the International Journal for Research in Marketing; is functional editor for Marketing for Interfaces, and is area editor at Marketing Science. He was editor-in-chief of Interfaces for six years.

He is a member of INFORMS, the American Marketing Association, the Product Development and Management Association, and the European Marketing Academy. He has served on the NSF advisory panel for the Decision and Management Sciences program.

He is the former president as well as vice president/publications for The Institute of Management Sciences. He is VP for external relations and an Inaugural Fellow of the European Marketing Academy and serves on the board of directors of the INFORMS College on Marketing. He is an inaugural INFORMS Fellow, was honored as Morse Lecturer for INFORMS and also received the George E. Kimball Medal for distinguished contributions to the field of operations research. The American Marketing Association announced Lilien as the 2008 recipient of the AMA Irwin/McGraw-Hill Distinguished Marketing Educator Award, the highest honor a marketing educator can receive. He has received honorary doctorates from the University of Liège, the University of Ghent and Aston University.

Lilien's research interests are in marketing decision support, marketing engineering, market segmentation, new product modeling and marketing-mix issues for business products, bargaining and negotiations in business markets, modeling the industrial buying process, and innovation diffusion modeling.

He consults for many companies and is principal of the Marketing Engineering consultancy, DecisionPro . More details are available at garylilien.info.

== See also ==
- Return on marketing investment
- Marketing mix modeling
- Marketing effectiveness
