= Leigh McAlister =

Leigh McAlister is a professor of business marketing at The University of Texas at Austin and is an executive director of the Marketing Science Institute. She is known for her work on retailing, consumer behaviour and variety seeking buying behavior.

Her published works include The Grocery Revolution, a joint project with Barbara E. Kahn.

== See also ==
- Variety seeking

== Selected publications ==
- McAlister, Leigh, and Edgar Pessemier. "Variety seeking behavior: An interdisciplinary review." Journal of Consumer research 9, no. 3 (1982): 311–322.
- Broniarczyk, Susan M., Wayne D. Hoyer, and Leigh McAlister. "Consumers' perceptions of the assortment offered in a grocery category: The impact of item reduction." Journal of Marketing Research (1998): 166–176.
- McAlister, Leigh. "A dynamic attribute satiation model of variety-seeking behavior." Journal of Consumer Research 9, no. 2 (1982): 141–150.
- Lattin, James M., and Leigh McAlister. "Using a variety-seeking model to identify substitute and complementary relationships among competing products." Journal of Marketing Research (1985): 330–339.
