= Russell S. Winer =

American marketing scholar

Academic background
- Education: Union College (BA); Carnegie Mellon University (MS, PhD)

Academic work
- Discipline: Business administration, marketing
- Sub-discipline: Customer relationship management, consumer choice, information technology
- Institutions: Columbia Business School; Owen Graduate School of Management; Haas School of Business; New York University Stern School of Business; University of the People

Russell Stuart Winer is an American marketing scholar, econometrician, and academic administrator. He is the William Joyce Professor of Marketing at the New York University Stern School of Business and dean of the department of business administration at the University of the People.

== Education ==
Winer earned a B.A. in economics from Union College in 1973, graduating with Phi Beta Kappa honors. He subsequently received an M.S. in 1975 and a Ph.D. in industrial administration in 19777 from Carnegie Mellon University. His doctoral dissertation, titled An econometric analysis of the effect of advertising on consumer behavior, was supervised by Richard Staelin.

== Career ==
Winer was a consultant for American Airlines, New York Telephone, Ogilvy & Mather, and Dancer Fitzgerald Sample. In the 1980s, he was a faculty member of the Owen Graduate School of Management at Vanderbilt University. In 1986, Winer joined the marketing firm, Nashville Consulting Group to perform conjoint analyses related to purchase decisions.

Since 2009, Winer has been the dean of the department of business administration at the University of the People. He leads the institution's Master of Business Administration program.

Winer is the William Joyce Professor of Marketing and has been chair of the marketing department at the New York University Stern School of Business. He has taught at the Indian School of Management and Entrepreneurship, Mumbai and has written three books and over 70 papers on marketing.

In 2015, Winer became a fellow of the American Marketing Association.

Winer has supported Sharpie's modern advertising methods, calling it "a really interesting, multichannel campaign". He has spoken about the difficulties when multiple brands are in a marketplace, and thinks the choice can sometimes overwhelm consumers. Along with Itamar Simonson, Winer has conducted research on shopping behavior.

== Selected works ==
=== Books ===
- Lehmann, Donald R.; Winer, Russell S. (1988). Analysis for marketing planning. Plano, Tex.: Business Publications. ISBN 978-0-256-05783-6. OCLC 17474237.
- Lehmann, Donald R; Winer, Russell S. (1997). Product management. Chicago: McGraw-Hill Education. ISBN 978-0-256-21439-0. OCLC 35001893.
- Winer, Russell S. (2004). Marketing Management. Prentice Hall. ISBN 978-0-13-140547-9.
- Winer, Russell S. (2005). Pricing. Cambridge, Mass.: Marketing Science Institute. ISBN 978-0-9657114-6-3. OCLC 63286707.
- Winer, Russell S; Neslin, Scott A (2014). The history of marketing science. Singapore; Hanover, MA: World Scientific Pub. Co.; Now Publishers Inc. ISBN 978-981-4596-48-0. OCLC 884330508.

=== Journal articles ===
- Winer, Russell S. (September 1986). "A Reference Price Model of Brand Choice for Frequently Purchased Products". Journal of Consumer Research. 13 (2): 250–256. doi:10.1086/209064. ISSN 0093-5301.
- Winer, Russell S. (July 2001). "A Framework for Customer Relationship Management". California Management Review. 43 (4): 89–105. doi:10.2307/41166102. ISSN 0008-1256. JSTOR 41166102. S2CID 5700859.
- Winer, Russell S. (May 2009). "New Communications Approaches in Marketing: Issues and Research Directions". Journal of Interactive Marketing. 23 (2): 108–117. doi:10.1016/j.intmar.2009.02.004. S2CID 19013556.
