= Marketing Science Institute =

Corporate-membership-based organization

The Marketing Science Institute (MSI) is a corporate-membership-based organization. MSI was founded in 1961 and is headquartered in Cambridge, Massachusetts.

MSI financially supports academic research on topics of importance to business performance. Every two years, MSI asks the board of trustees to provide input to help set priorities for the research that will guide activities for the next few years. MSI supports studies by academics on these issues and disseminates the results through conferences, workshops, webinars, publications, and online content.

== History ==
In 1961, Scott Paper Company President Thomas B. McCabe founded the “Institute for Science in Marketing” with input from leading thinkers John Howard, Albert Wesley Frey, and Wroe Alderson. Twenty-nine companies responded to his membership appeal, establishing MSI as a nonprofit organization that would “contribute to the emergence of a definitive science of marketing” and “stimulate increased application of scientific techniques to the understanding and solving of current marketing problems.” Offices were established in Philadelphia near the University of Pennsylvania's Wharton School, and Wendell Smith became its first president.

MSI's founding coincided with a period of booming growth in the U.S. marketing systems, fueled by pent-up demand from war-years restrictions on production of consumer goods, and an explosion in population growth. Key marketing concepts, such as the “4 Ps” (product, price, place, promotion) of marketing were introduced. Management science theory, methods, and tools were infused into marketing, and consumer behavior emerged as an area of study within marketing.

In its first decade, MSI supported the development of new tools for marketers, such as multidimensional scaling, stochastic modeling, causal modeling, and decision calculus marketing. It also provided the foundation for advances in new product development. In 1968, MSI moved to Cambridge and began a 15-year association with the Harvard Business School.

In the early 1970s, MSI launched and managed the Profit Impact of Marketing Strategy project which, in conjunction with General Electric, created and analyzed a cross-sectional database that described marketing strategies and profitability across hundreds of business units. The results, widely reported, demonstrated the value of a scientific approach to marketing.

In the late 1970s and early 1980s, MSI assembled teams to shape policy at the Federal Trade Commission and the U.S. Department of Agriculture. MSI also played an important role in introducing qualitative consumer research methods, including the Consumer Behavior Odyssey, a summer-long road trip in 1986 that laid the foundation for the field of consumer ethnography.

By the 1980s, MSI research on services marketing reflected a growing awareness that consumer service businesses required a reappraisal of marketing approaches originally developed in the packaged goods context. In 1986, a consortium of MSI member companies contributed funding and data to support a stream of research that culminated in SERVQUAL, a scale for measuring customer perceptions of service quality that has been widely adopted by service businesses. During this time, the role of marketing in strategic planning received increased attention. MSI research introduced key concepts such as market orientation and marketing capabilities.

The conceptualization and measurement of brand equity originated in MSI-sponsored research in the early 1990s. The impact of marketing activities on firm performance and shareholder value (termed marketing ROI, marketing accountability, and return on marketing investment) has been an area of sustained MSI research interest. Through the 1990s and early 2000s, MSI's research agenda also included product and service innovation, as well as innovation in business models and processes.

In 2002, MSI launched the "Relevant Knowledge" monograph series. In over one dozen titles, academic experts summarize "what we have learned" and "what we still need to know" about important areas of research - including social networks, relationship marketing, innovation, consumer behavior, and marketing ROI - and offer useful guidance to marketers to fuel better decision making.

Since the mid-2000s, new technologies, analytic capabilities, and social media platforms have dramatically altered the marketing landscape. The 2018-2020 Research Priorities include: (1) Cultivating the Customer Asset, (2) The Evolving Landscape of Martech and Advertising, (3) The Rise of Omnichannel Promotion and Distribution, (4) Capturing Information to Fuel Growth and (5) Organizing for Marketing Agility

== Presidents ==
- Linda Vytlacil, Interim, 2019
- Cheryl Cramer Toto, 2017-2019
- Marni Zea Clippinger, 2016-2017 Office of the President: Chief Marketing Officer, Chief Operating Officer, and executive director, 2002-2016
- William H. Moult, 2000-2002
- William A. Ghormley, 1998-2000
- H. Paul Root, 1990-1998
- F. Kent Mitchel, 1987-1990
- Alden G. Clayton, 1977-1986
- Thomas B. McCabe, Jr., 1972-1977
- Edwin L. Morris, 1969-1972
- Wendell R. Smith, 1962-1969

== Executive Directors ==
- John Lynch Jr., University of Colorado 2022-2023
- Barbara Kahn, University of Pennsylvania, 2019-2021
- Carl F. Mela, Duke University, 2017-2019
- Katherine N. Lemon, Boston College, 2015-2017
- Kevin Lane Keller, Dartmouth College, 2013-2015
- John A. Deighton, Harvard Business School, 2011-2013
- Ruth N. Bolton, Marketing Science Institute, 2009-2011
- Russell S. Winer, New York University, 2007-2009
- Dominique Hanssens, UCLA, 2005-2007
- Leigh McAlister, University of Texas at Austin, 2003-2005
- Donald R. Lehmann, Columbia University, 1993–95, 2001-2003
- David J. Reibstein, University of Pennsylvania, 1999-2001
- Rohit Deshpandé, Harvard Business School, 1997-1999
- David B. Montgomery, Stanford University, 1995-1997
- Richard Staelin, Duke University, 1991-1993
- George S. Day, University of Pennsylvania, 1989-1991
- Frederick E. Webster, Jr., Dartmouth College, 1987-1989
- John U. Farley, Dartmouth College, 1985-1987
- Louis W. Stern, Northwestern University, 1983-1985
- E. Raymond Corey, Harvard Business School, 1981-1983
- Stephen A. Greyser, Harvard Business School, 1972-1980
- Robert D. Buzzell, Harvard Business School, 1968-1972
