= Vithala R. Rao =

Vithala Rajeswara Rao
- Title: Deane Malott Professor

Academic background
- Education: University of Pennsylvania; University of Michigan; University of Bombay; Andhra University
- Thesis: The Salience of Price in the Perception and Evaluation of Product Quality (1970)
- Doctoral advisor: Paul E. Green

Academic work
- Discipline: Marketing
- Institutions: Cornell University
- Doctoral students: Irene Rosenfeld
- Website: https://www.johnson.cornell.edu/Faculty-And-Research/Profile?id=vrr2

Vithala R. Rao is the Deane Malott Professor of Management and Professor of Marketing and Quantitative Methods at Samuel Curtis Johnson Graduate School of Management, Cornell University.

== Books ==
- Applied Conjoint Analysis, 2014
- Applied Multidimensional Scaling: A Comparison of Alternative Approaches and Algorithms, (with P.E. Green), New York: Holt, Rinehart and Winston, Inc., 1972.
