= Journal of Marketing Research =

- Discipline: Marketing
- Language: English
- Edited by: Sachin Gupta (academic)

Publication details
- History: 1964-present
- Publisher: American Marketing Association (United States)
- Frequency: Bimonthly
- Impact factor: 5.000 (2020)

Standard abbreviations
- ISO 4: J. Mark. Res.

Indexing
- CODEN: JMKRAE
- ISSN: 0022-2437 (print); 1547-7193 (web)
- LCCN: 68004962
- OCLC no.: 1783303

Links
- Journal homepage; Online access; Online archive

Journal of Marketing Research is a bimonthly peer-reviewed academic journal published by the American Marketing Association. It was established in 1964 and covers all aspects of marketing research. According to the Journal Citation Reports, the journal has a 2020 impact factor of 5.000. The founding editor was Robert Ferber.

== Awards ==
- In 1996 the journal established the Paul E. Green Award in honor of Paul E. Green for the best article in the Journal of Marketing Research that demonstrates the greatest potential to contribute significantly to the practice of marketing research.
- The journal awards the William F. O'Dell Award for the article that has made the most significant, long-term contribution to marketing theory, methodology, and/or practice.

== Editors-in-chief ==
The following persons are or have been editor-in-chief of this journal:

- Robert Ferber (1964–1969)
- Frank Bass (1972-1975)
- Ralph Day (1969-1972)
- Harper Boyd
- Gilbert A. Churchill (1978-1982)
- William Perreault (1983-1985)
- Robert Peterson (1986-1988)
- Michael Houston (1988-1991)
- Barton Weitz (1992-1994)
- Vijay Mahajan (1995-1997)
- Russell S. Winer (1997-2000)
- Wagner A. Kamakura (2000-2003)
- Dick R. Wittink (2003-2005)
- Russell S. Winer (2005-2006)
- Joel Huber (2006–2009)
- Tulin Erdem (2009-2012)
- Robert Meyer (2012-2016)
- Rajdeep Grewal (2016–2020)
- Sachin Gupta (2020-2023)
