= Devarakonda Vittal Rao =

Indian politician

D. Vittal Rao
- Constituency: Mahabubnagar

Personal details
- Born: 14 November 1947 Mahbubnagar, Andhra Pradesh, India (now in Telangana, India)
- Died: 28 May 2016 (aged 68) Hyderabad office = MP
- Party: INC
- Spouse: D. Nirmala
- Children: 2 sons and 2 daughters
- As of 26 September, 2006

Devarakonda Vittal Rao (14 November 1947 – 28 May 2016) was a member of the 14th Lok Sabha of India. He represented the Mahabubnagar constituency of Andhra Pradesh and was a member of the Indian National Congress (INC) political party.

== Early life ==
His father, Sayappa, was a herbal doctor in a remote village called Lagacharla in Mahbubnagar District of Andhra Pradesh; his mother, Thimamma, was a housewife. He completed his M.A. and also served as a student leader.

== Career ==
He moved up the political ranks from Joint Secretary to Treasurer of the Andhra Pradesh Congress Committee to Member of the Lok Sabha, the lower house of the Parliament of India.

== Death ==
On 28 May 2016 he died. His family declared it as a normal death.
