= Vittal Rao K. =

Tamil writer

Vittal Rao, K.
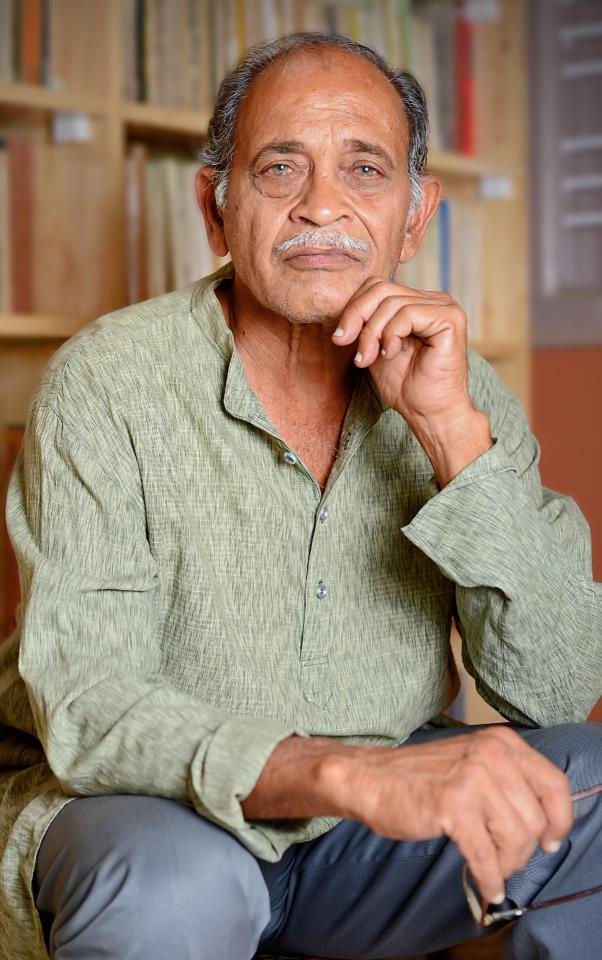
- Vittal Krishna Rao
- Born: 12 May 1942 (age 82); Hosur, Krishnagiri district, Tamil Nadu
- Spouse: Kamala Vittal
- Children: Harini Vittal Karthik

Vittal Rāo K (born 12 May 1942) is a Tamil writer who was born at Hosur, a small town in the Krishnagiri district of Tamil Nadu, India. Although a Kannadiga by birth, Tamil was his medium of instruction since he did his schooling in Tamil Nadu. A man of varied talents, he took to writing in his early twenties, but he became a recognizable face in the local literary circles when his short stories started appearing in popular Tamil weekly magazines such as Ananda Vikatan in 1967. In his literary career spanning over four decades, Vittal Rao has written 9 novels, 5 collections of 140 short stories and 7 essays ranging from world cinema to fine art, history and literature.

== Biography ==
=== Personal life ===
Vittal Rao was born in Hosur, a small town in the old Salem district of Tamil Nadu, India. He was the sixth of eight siblings born to Saraswathi and Krishna Rāo. He spent most of his childhood and adolescent days in Salem before moving to Chennai in 1960 to work as a radiographer at Stanley Medical College and Hospital there. It was during this time that he developed an interest in fine arts and literature which encouraged him to enroll at the prestigious Government College of Fine Arts, Chennai (formerly known as the Madras School of Art) in Chennai. He joined Madras Telephones later, in 1963, where he continued to work until his retirement in May, 2002. Working at Madras Telephones, allowed him to pursue his interest in fine arts and literature. One of his favorite pastimes included browsing the Moor Market, near the Madras Central Railway Station, which used to be a popular hangout of literary and art aficionados where used books from around the world could be bought at a bargain.

=== Works ===
His first short story appeared in the popular weekly, Ananda Vikatan in 1967, and from there on his writings have appeared in all the popular as well as little literary magazines.

His novel, Pokkidam (Refuge, 1976), which won the best novel award instituted by Ilakkiya Chintanai, brought him to serious literary attention. He has so far written 9 novels, long and short, and over a hundred short stories, of which only 4 collections have come out.

To talk about a few of his significant works, Nadhimoolam (Source of the river, 1981), unfolds the lives of three generations of a Madhava Brahmin family, dovetailing the narrative with the happenings and movements outside in society. It is a large and intricate tapestry of varied designs and colors, of interacting social forces in individual human lives. The happenings in society that he has woven into the story are authentic historical developments. It is a unique work in Tamil in that, while reading the lives of individuals one also reads the history of social changes, both bound up inextricably.

In Kaalaveli (Temporal expanse, 1988) the author presents a segment in lives of some students of an arts school with all their aspirations, frustrations, mutual jealousies and compromises in life. It is almost a documentary record of the milieu of artists and writers in Madras city in the seventies. In fact, all his works have a documentary dimension with authentic history as a background, intricately woven in to the narrative he chooses to unfold.

His novels have the dimension of being the chronicles of social history with a keen sense of observation and with an eye for detail. These qualities mark him out as one of the few significant novelists the twentieth century has given to contemporary Tamil literature.

== Bibliography ==
=== Novels ===
- Innoru Tāj Mahāl (இன்னொரு தாஜ் மஹால் - Another Taj Mahal, 1974)
- Pōkkidam (போக்கிடம் - Refuge, 1976)
- Thooral (தூறல் - Rain shower, 1976)
- Nadhimoolam (நதிமூலம் - Source of the river,1981)
- Matravargal (மற்றவர்கள் - Others, 1992)
- Meendum Avalukkaaga (மீண்டும் அவளுக்காக - Once again for her, 1993)
- Kaalaveli (காலவெளி - Temporal expanse, 1993)
- Vanna Mugangal (வண்ண முகங்கள் - Colorful faces, 1994)
- Comradugal (காம்ரேடுகள் - Comrades, 1996)

== Awards ==
- Ilakkiya Chintanai (இலக்கிய சிந்தனை விருது)
