= Paul E. Green =

American marketing professor and statistician

Paul Edgar Green
- Title: S.S. Kresge Professor of Marketing

Academic background
- Education: University of Pennsylvania

Academic work
- Discipline: Marketing
- Institutions: University of Pennsylvania
- Doctoral students: Vithala R. Rao

Paul Edgar Green (4 April 1927 – 21 September 2012) was an American marketing professor and statistician. He was S.S. Kresge Professor of Marketing, and later Professor Emeritus at the Wharton School, University of Pennsylvania.

He was the founder of conjoint analysis and one of "major architects of modern marketing science and practice", having popularised the use of Bayesian statistics, multidimensional scaling, clustering, and qualitative data analysis within the marketing discipline. He wrote more than sixteen books and 200 articles on market research-related subjects. His seminal article "Conjoint Analysis in Consumer Research: Issues and Outlook," has been cited more than 750 times in ISI..

In 1980 he became a Fellow of the American Statistical Association. In 1996 the Journal of Marketing Research established the Paul E. Green Award for the best article in the Journal of Marketing Research was established in his honour. He was the recipient of many awards including: The Parlin Award for Advancement of Science in Marketing, the AMA/Irwin Marketing Educator of the Year Award, The Outstanding Marketing Educator Award, and the Lifetime Achievement in Marketing Research Award and he was also the subject of a biographical outline in the Legends of Marketing, series published by Sage Publications.

== Books ==
- Paul E. Green, Donald S. Tull and Paul Eliot, Research for Marketing Decisions, N.J., Prentice-Hall, 1975
- Lattin, James M., J. Douglas Carroll, and Paul E. Green, Analyzing Multivariate Data, 1978
- Yoram Wind and Paul E. Green, Marketing Research and Modeling: Progress and Prospects,(with A Tribute to Paul E. Green), Springer Science and Business Media, 2013
