= Indian School of Business =

Business school in Hyderabad, India

- Type: Private business school
- Established: 2001; 25 years ago
- Founders: Rajat Gupta; Anil Kumar
- Accreditation: Triple accreditation; AACSB; AMBA; EQUIS
- Chairman: Harish Manwani
- Dean: Madan Pillutla
- Academic staff: 65 permanent (104 visiting)
- Location: Hyderabad (from 2001) and Mohali (from 2012), India
- Campus: Urban, 260 acres (105.2 ha)
- Colours: Innovation Blue; Legacy Blue
- Website: ISB Website

The Indian School of Business (ISB) is a private business school with campuses in Hyderabad and Mohali, India. It offers various post-graduate management programs.

== History ==
The Indian School of Business (ISB) was started in 1996 by a group of businessmen and academics. Co-founders Rajat Gupta and Anil Kumar, senior executives of McKinsey & Company, directed teams of McKinsey consultants to start the school. Gupta recruited U.S. business leaders while Kumar recruited Indian leaders for its executive board. Formal partnerships were established with international business schools Wharton and Kellogg. Pramath Sinha, then a junior partner at McKinsey in India, was persuaded to take a leave of absence to be the school's first dean. Rajat Gupta became the school's first chairman and was succeeded by Adi Godrej in 2011. The then Chief Minister of Andhra Pradesh Sri N. Chandrababu Naidu played an important role for establishment of ISB in Hyderabad. The foundation stone for the campus was laid in 1999 and was inaugurated by Prime Minister Atal Bihari Vajpayee in 2001. The Government of Punjab sanctioned the Mohali Campus in 2010; its foundation stone was laid in September 2010 by Punjab Chief Minister Parkash Singh Badal, and was inaugurated in December 2012 by the then Union Minister of Finance, P. Chidambaram.

Dipak Jain, Raghuram Rajan, Madhav Rajan are famous Indian academics who teach and research at ISB

== Campuses ==
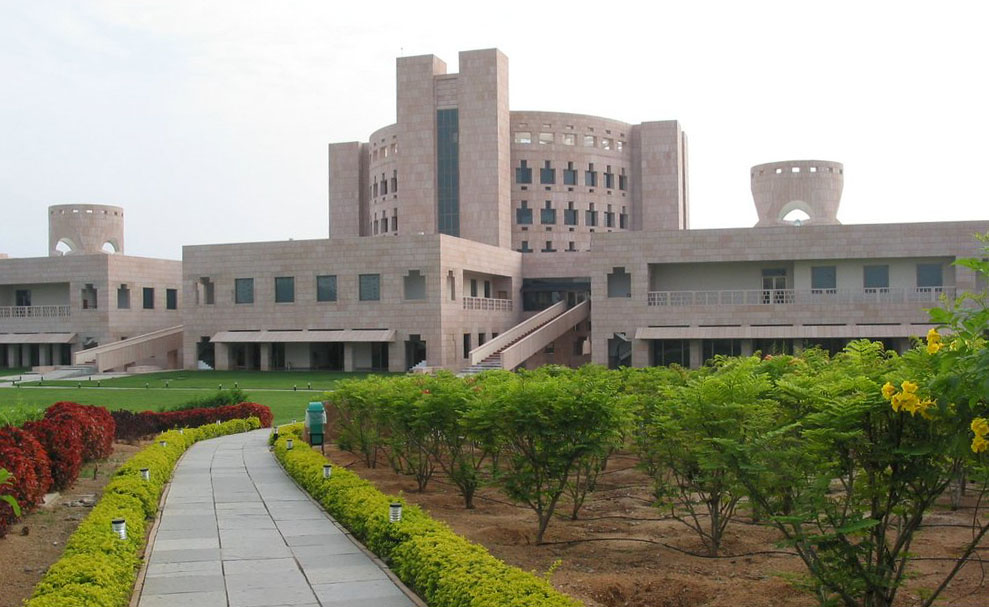
ISB's Hyderabad campus (top) and Mohali campus (bottom)

The Indian School of Business has two parallel campuses in Hyderabad, Telangana and Mohali, Punjab.

=== Hyderabad campus ===
It is the older campus and was designed by Vikram Lall and established in 2001 and is spread across 260 acres (110 ha). It includes the academic centre, a recreation centre, and four student villages each accommodating 130 to 210 students. Upon its completion in 2011, the 19-storey Faculty Housing Tower became the tallest building in Hyderabad. The Indian School of Business (ISB) inaugurated the Motilal Oswal Center on 5 September 2025.

The Hyderabad campus is certified by the Indian green building council.

=== Mohali campus ===
The modern Mohali campus began operations on 14 April 2012, and offers ISB's Post-Graduate Programme (PGP) and additional short-term executive education programs. The campus was designed by Perkins Eastman Architects led by Aaron Schwarz. The entire campus is Wi-Fi enabled. The academic block houses lecture theatres, faculty offices and lounge, the learning resource centre (LRC), and an atrium which can serve as a 500-seat auditorium. The campus also hosts four other research institutes:

- Max Institute of Healthcare Management
- Bharti Institute of Public Policy
- Munjal Institute for Global Manufacturing
- Punj Lloyd Institute of Infrastructure Management

== Academics ==
=== Accreditation ===
ISB is accredited by AMBA, EQUIS and AACSB. ISB became the 100th Triple Accredited institution in the world upon achieving AMBA accreditation on 12 May 2020.

ISB is not accredited by the All India Council for Technical Education (AICTE) and has not applied for such accreditation, as it offers a certificate program and not a degree or a diploma. The US Citizenship and Immigration Services (USCIS) has ruled that for the purposes of US Visa and Green Cards, the post-graduate PGP certificate awarded by ISB is not equivalent to a Master of Business Administration degree, unlike similarly named certificates awarded by the Indian Institutes of Management.

=== Programmes ===
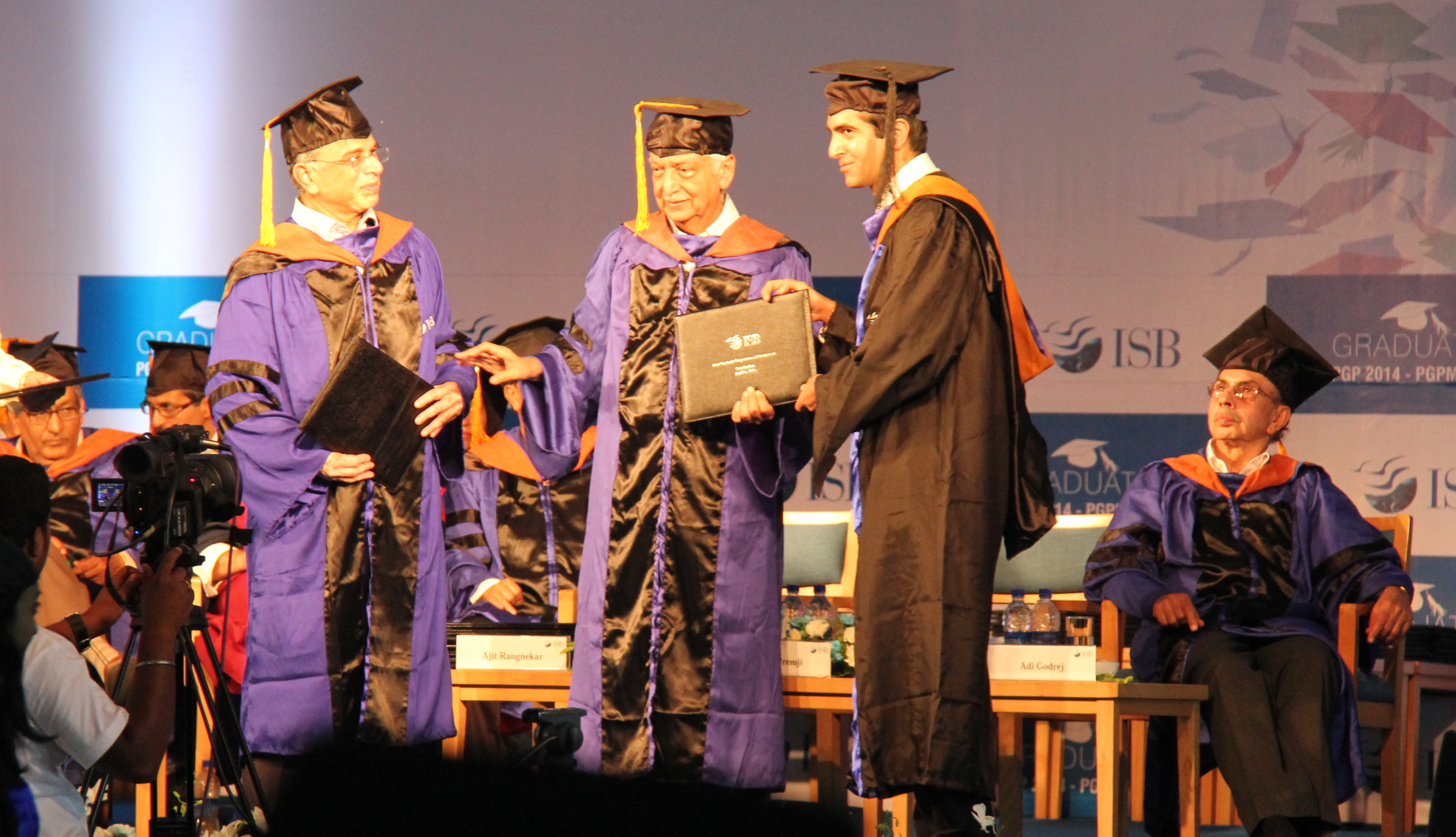
Student receiving academic degree from Azim Premji during convocation, 2014. ISB Chairman Adi Godrej is in background.

ISB is the academic partner for the Goldman Sachs 10,000 Women Entrepreneurs Certificate programme in India which provides management education to "under-served women".

==== Young Leaders Programme ====
The Young Leaders Programme (YLP) select undergraduate students for mentoring over a period of two years while they work. Mentored students can join ISB following successful completion of the work-mentorship programme. 45 undergraduate students were selected for when the programme began in 2011. ISB discontinued the Young Leaders Programme in 2025 in favour of a separate PGP-YL program.

==== Management Programme in Public Policy ====
The Management Programme in Public Policy (MPPP) began in 2015 and was developed by the Bharti Institute of Public Policy in consultation with The Fletcher School of Law and Diplomacy. The programme is oriented towards mid-career professionals, examining public policy perspectives on a wide range of economic and management subjects. The first class of students were drawn from government, public sector and civil society organisations.

==== ISB Policy Conclave ====
The ISB Policy Conclave is a policy-focused event organised by the Indian School of Business (ISB), bringing together policymakers, industry representatives, academics, and other stakeholders to discuss public policy issues. Conclaves have addressed topics including financial inclusion, artificial intelligence, and the gig and platform economy .

=== ISBInsight ===
ISBInsight (stylized ISBInsight) is the biannual research periodical of ISB, featuring articles based on management research from Indian and emerging markets. It presents research across management areas such as strategy, marketing, information technology, accounting, behavioural studies, finance, economics and public policy. It also publishes interviews with leaders and decision makers from industry, academia, government and non-governmental organisations.

== Rankings ==
Institute rankings

Business – international
- QS (MBA) (2024): 78
- QS (MBA-Asia) (2024): 14
- QS (EMBA) (2024): 101-110
- QS (EMBA-Asian) (2024): 13

Worldwide, the Financial Times has ranked ISB 12th in its Global MBA Ranking 2026. The Quacquarelli Symonds ranked ISB 86th in the world and 11th in Asia in the QS World University Rankings Global MBA Rankings 2025. The EMBA plan was ranked in the 101-110 band in the world and 13 in Asia by the QS World University Rankings in 2024.

== Notable alumni ==
=== Business ===
- Nipun Malhotra, Founder, Nipman Foundation.
- Aman Gupta, Co-Founder & CMO, boAt Lifestyle.
- Shreya Gupta, VP Strategy, Spotdraft

=== Arts, Entertainment, and Writing ===
- Shilpa Singh, Miss Universe India 2012
- Runki Goswami, Indian Classical singer and composer.
- Namrata Brar, Indian-American journalist
- Shvetha Jaishankar (MBA 04), Co-founder Globosport, Miss India International 1998, and Author.
- Ravinder Singh, Author.

=== Sports ===
- Anshul Kothari, Indian swimming team.
- Viren Rasquinha (MBA 09) - Former Indian Olympic Hockey player.
- Ajay Jayaram (MBA 23) - Former Indian Badminton Player.

== See also ==
- List of business schools in Hyderabad, India
