= Gerald Zaltman =

American academic, author, and editor

- Born: 1938 (age 87–88)

Academic background
- Education: University of Chicago Booth School of Business; Johns Hopkins University; Bates College

Academic work
- Discipline: Marketing
- Sub-discipline: Market research
- Institutions: Harvard Business School; University of Pittsburgh

Gerald Zaltman (born 1938) is an American market researcher who is the Joseph C. Wilson Professor Emeritus at Harvard Business School and the author and editor of 20 books. His newest book is Dare to Think Differently: How Open-Mindedness Creates Exceptional Decision-Making, (Stanford University Press, 2026). Other books include the international best selling How Customers Think (Harvard Business Press), and Marketing Metaphoria (Harvard Business Press, 2008). In 1997 he founded the market research consulting firm Olson Zaltman Associates in partnership with Jerry C. Olson, Professor of Marketing Emeritus, Smeal College of Business at Penn State. Zaltman patented the Zaltman Metaphor Elicitation Technique, a method used to delve into the unconscious thinking that drives behavior.

Zaltman's academic specialization is in innovation, social change, and the representation of thought, which is expressed in a variety of publications throughout his career.

== Education ==
Zaltman received his AB degree in Government from Bates College in 1960. Two years later, he was awarded an MBA from the University of Chicago. He was awarded a Doctoral degree in Sociology from Johns Hopkins University in 1968.

== Work ==
After serving on the faculty of Northwestern University's Kellogg School of Management (1968–1975) and on the faculty at the University of Pittsburgh (1975–1991), Zaltman was named the Joseph C. Wilson professor of Business Administration at Harvard Business School in 1991.

While at Harvard, Zaltman was awarded U.S. patent 5,436,830 for the Zaltman Metaphor Elicitation Technique (ZMET) in 1995, served as Director of the Seeing the Voice of the Customer Laboratory at Harvard Business School, and was co-director of the HBS Mind of the Market Laboratory.

In 1997, he and Jerry Olson from Penn State University's Smeal College of Business co-founded Olson Zaltman Associates, a market research and consulting firm that has worked with many Fortune 500 corporations including Procter & Gamble, Coca-Cola, Frito-Lay, Audi, Kraft, and Cisco.

Dr. Zaltman received the inaugural Trailblazer Award for Impactful Contributions in Marketing from the Assn of Collegiate Marketing Educators in 2023, the AMA's Palin Award in 2019 for his career impact on the field of Market Research.

== Deep metaphors ==
Deep metaphors are unconscious "basic orienting structures of human thought" that affect how people process and react to information or a stimulus. They manifest themselves in surface metaphors used in everyday language and conversation; when grouped they constitute clues to what deep metaphor a person is using to frame or understand a topic (see Framing). Deep metaphors can be used in a marketing context to help marketers communicate more effectively to consumers about a brand, product, or topic with the same viewing lens, or deep metaphor, their consumers are already using.

Cognitive linguists have written about the relationship between metaphor and its impact on the mind, specifically George Lakoff and Mark Johnson in Metaphors We Live By and Zoltan Kovecses in Metaphor: A Practical Introduction.. In Zaltman's book, Marketing Metaphoria, he outlines what he calls the seven giants or the most basic and most recurring deep metaphors : journey, balance, container, connection, resource, control, and transformation. There are others such as force and paradox which are less common.

== Zaltman Metaphor Elicitation Technique ==
Zaltman Metaphor Elicitation Technique is the first patented market research tool in the United States. ZMET is a technique designed to elicit metaphors using a series of steps and non-directive probing.

=== Origin and patent ===
ZMET was born during a trip Zaltman took to remote areas of Nepal in 1990. He gave locals, who had never taken photos before, cameras to take pictures of important things and events in their lives. For example, in some cases, the assignment was: What photos would you take if you wanted to show someone else what life was like here? Two weeks later he returned to the regions covered initially, gave copies to the photographers, and interviewed them about the meaning of their photos. Zaltman realized just how powerful the use of images “owned” by those being interviewed were in gaining a deep understanding of their implicit or tacit assumptions and beliefs. Zaltman noticed, for example, that they often cut off the feet of people appearing in their images. It was discovered that this was deliberate. The Nepalese did not want to embarrass their friends and neighbors by showing their bare feet, which was a sign of poverty, and for this reason deliberately chose to leave it out of the photographic record.

=== Development ===
Zaltman began to wonder how this kind of insight could be used to gather consumer insights. In 1993, he formed the Seeing the Voice of the Customer Lab at Harvard Business School, and, in 1997, it was renamed the Mind of the Market Lab.

ZMET draws on a variety of disciplines including neurobiology, psychology, semiotics, linguistics, and art theory to elicit metaphors that can reveal how a person conceptualizes a given topic. Metaphors are a way of learning or understanding a new piece of information by comparing it to a known piece of information (see Conceptual metaphor).

=== Applications ===
ZMET focuses on explaining the "why" behind the "what" of consumer behavior, allowing it to be used in a variety of applications from product development to communications evaluation. Increasingly, it is being used to address issues faced by non-profit organizations and to address organizational matters.

== Other patents ==
=== Neuroimaging as a marketing tool ===
U.S. patent 6,099,319 was issued on August 8, 2000 to Gerald Zaltman and Stephen Kosslyn on "neuroimaging as a means for validating whether a stimulus such as advertisement, communication, or product evokes a certain mental response such as emotion, preference, or memory, or to predict the consequences of the stimulus on later behavior such as consumption or purchasing."

=== Metaphor elicitation technique ===
U.S. patent 6,315,569 was issued on November 13, 2001 to protect the right for using:

a metaphor elicitation technique in conjunction with physiological function monitoring to elicit, organize, and analyze data pertaining to a research topic. This data provides further insight and understanding which can be used in creating an appropriate marketing campaign for a product, improving inter-office communications and determining the presence of pre-existing biases or beliefs.

== Selected publications ==
=== Books ===
- Zaltman, G. and L. Zaltman, Marketing Metaphoria: What Deep Metaphors Reveal about the Minds of Consumers (2008).
- Zaltman, Gerald. How Customers Think: Essential Insights into the Mind of the Markets. Boston: Harvard Business School Press (2003).
- Barabba, V., and G. Zaltman. Hearing the Voice of the Market: Competitive Advantage Through Creative Use of Market Information. Boston: Harvard Business School Press (1991).

=== Selected articles ===
- 2022 – “Open or Closed? Your Mind, Your Decision,” in Dawn Iacobucci (ed), Introduction to Reflections of Eminent Marketing Scholars, in Foundations and Trends in Marketing, Vol 16, No. 1–2.
- 2020 – “A Theories-in-Use Approach to Building Marketing Theory,” Journal of Marketing, Vol 84, No. 1, pp. 32–51.
- 2017 – “Barriers to Advancing the Science and Practice of Marketing” (with Andrew Scott Baron and Jerry Olson), Journal of Marketing Management, May 2016, pp. 1–16.
- 2016 – “Marketing's Forthcoming Age of Imagination,” AMS Review, December 2016, pp. 99–115.
- 2016 – “Five Things I Know About Marketing,” Marketing Science Institute, December 2016.
- 2015 – “Toward a New Marketing Science for Hospitality Managers” (with Jerry Olson and James Forr), Cornell Hospitality Quarterly, August 2015, pp. 1–8.
- 2014 – “Are You Mistaking Facts for Insights,” Journal of Advertising Research, December 2014, pp. 1–4.
- 2007 – Zaltman, G. and D. MacCaba, “Metaphor in Advertising.” In The SAGE Handbook of Advertising, pp. 135–154.
- 2006 – Zaltman, G. and L. Zaltman, “What Do ‘Really Good’ Managers and ‘Really Good’ Researchers’ Want of One Another?” In The Handbook of Marketing Research: Uses, Misuses, and Future Advances, pp. 33–48.
- 2006 – Braun-Latour, Kathryn A., and Gerald Zaltman. “Memory Change: An Intimate Measure of Persuasion.” Journal of Advertising Research, March 2006, pp. 57–72.
- 2005 – Mast, Fred W., and Gerald Zaltman. “A Behavioral Window on the Mind of the Market: An Application of the Response Time Paradigm.” Brain Research Bulletin, Vol. 67, No. 5, November 2005, pp. 422–427.
- 2001 – Coulter, Robin A., Gerald Zaltman, and Keith S. Coulter. “Interpreting Consumer Perceptions of Advertising: An Application of the Zaltman Metaphor Elicitation Technique.” Journal of Advertising, Winter 2001.
- 2000 – Zaltman, Gerald. “Consumer Researchers: Take a Hike!” Journal of Consumer Research, Vol. 26, No. 4, March 2000, pp. 423–428.
- 1998 – Rangan, V. K., Das Narayandas, and Gerald Zaltman. “The Pedagogy of Executive Education in Business Markets.” Journal of Business-to-Business Marketing, Fall 1998.
- 1997 – Zaltman, Gerald. “Rethinking Market Research: Putting People Back In.” Journal of Marketing Research, Vol. 34, No. 4, November 1997.
- 1996 – Zaltman, Gerald. “Metaphorically Speaking.” Marketing Research, Vol. 8, No. 2, Summer 1996.
- 1995 – Venkatesh, R., A. J. Kohli, and Gerald Zaltman. “Influence Strategies in Buying Centers.” Journal of Marketing, Vol. 59, No. 4, October 1995, pp. 71–82.
- 1995 – Zaltman, Gerald, and R. Coulter. “Seeing the Voice of the Customer: Metaphor-based Advertising Research.” Journal of Advertising Research, Vol. 35, No. 4, July–August 1995, pp. 35–51.
- 1993 – Moorman, C., R. Deshpande, and G. Zaltman. “Factors Affecting Trust in Market Research Relationships.” Journal of Marketing, Vol. 57, No. 1, January 1993, pp. 81–101.
- 1992 – Moorman, C., G. Zaltman, and Rohit Deshpandé. “Relationships between Providers and Users of Market Research: The Dynamics of Trust within and between Organizations.” Journal of Marketing Research, Vol. 29, No. 3, August 1992, pp. 314–328.

== See also ==
- Conceptual blending
- Co-creation
- Conceptual metaphor
- Social marketing
