= Journal of Marketing =

- Discipline: Marketing
- Language: English
- Edited by: Shrihari Sridhar

Publication details
- History: 1936-present
- Publisher: American Marketing Association (United States)
- Frequency: Bimonthly
- Impact factor: 9.43 (2019)

Standard abbreviations
- ISO 4: J. Mark.

Indexing
- CODEN: JMKTAK
- ISSN: 0022-2429 (print); 1547-7185 (web)
- LCCN: 38024264
- OCLC no.: 1782320

Links
- Journal homepage; Online access; Online archive

The Journal of Marketing is a bimonthly scholarly journal that publishes peer-reviewed research in marketing. It is published by the American Marketing Association. Established in 1936, It is the fourth-oldest major journal covering marketing issues; others include the Harvard Business Review (1920), the Journal of Retailing (1925), and the Journal of Business (1928).

== Editors ==
As of 2025, Jan-Benedict E.M. Steenkamp serves as the Editor-in-Chief of the Journal of Marketing. He is the Knox Massey Distinguished Professor of Marketing at Kenan-Flagler Business School, University of North Carolina at Chapel Hill. The co-editors are Marc Fischer, Kelly Haws, Maura Scott, and Rebecca Slotegraaf. A list of past editors can be found at https://www.ama.org/past-editors-journal-of-marketing/.

== Special issues ==
The journal has published special issues on various topics, including one on mapping the boundaries of marketing that was sponsored by the Marketing Science Institute.

== Awards ==
The journal presents three article-focused honors on an annual basis. The H. Paul Root Award honors the best article from the most recent volume, The Hunt/Maynard Award honors recent contributions to marketing theory, and the JM/Jagdish Sheth Foundation honors articles that have had a long-term impact.
