= American Marketing Association =

Professional association for marketing professionals

The American Marketing Association (AMA) is a professional association for marketing professionals with 30,000 members as of 2012. It has 76 professional chapters and 250 collegiate chapters across the United States.

The AMA was formed in 1937 (89 years ago) from the merger of two predecessor organizations, the National Association of Marketing Teachers and the American Marketing Society. It also publishes a number of handbooks and research monographs. The AMA publishes the Journal of Marketing, Journal of Marketing Research, Journal of Public Policy and Marketing, Journal of International Marketing, Journal of Interactive Marketing, and Marketing News. It sponsors the collegiate honor society, Alpha Mu Alpha.

== Organization ==
The American Marketing Association has a board of directors that are elected annually by its members and a set of councils that are appointed. The headquarters are located in Chicago.

== History ==
At a 1915 convention of the Associated Advertising Clubs of the World, a group of advertising teachers established the National Association of Teachers of Advertising (NATA). Initial discussions revolved around the definition of advertising and the study of advertising. The group's name changed to the National Association of Teachers of Marketing & Advertising (NATMA) and then the National Association of Teachers of Marketing (NATM) as its focus expanded to marketing, incorporating educators from a variety of disciplines, including economics and accounting.

Approximately 15 years later, a second organization, the American Marketing Society (AMS), was founded, dedicated to the science of marketing. Lewis and Owen explained that the first president, Paul Nystrom, "expressed a need to find ways of lowering the cost of marketing, a concern for criticisms against marketing, and an interest in finding 'useful tools and devices in marketing practice'".

The two organizations jointly published the Journal of Marketing in 1936 and merged in 1937 to form the American Marketing Association. The association was housed at the University of Illinois in its early years and eventually moved its headquarters to Chicago as its professional staff expanded. As the study and practice of marketing became more sophisticated and specialized, the AMA also provided new offerings with the launch of the Journal of Marketing Research (1964) and acquisitions of the Journal of Public Policy & Marketing from the University of Michigan in 1990, and the Journal of International Marketing from Michigan State University in 1997. In 2022, the AMA acquired the Journal of Interactive Marketing.

== See also ==
- List of fellows of the American Marketing Association

== General Reference ==
- American Marketing Association, New York Capital Region Records, 1992-2013. M.E. Grenander Department of Special Collections and Archives, University Libraries, University at Albany, State University of New York (hereafter referred to as the AMA-NYCR Records).
