= Eyal Biyalogorsky =

Professor of Marketing

Prof. Eyal Biyalogorsky
- אייל בילוגורסקי
- Citizenship: Israel
- Education: BSc in Electrical Engineering from Tel-Aviv University in 1988, PhD from Fuqua School of Business at Duke University in Durham North Carolina in 1998
- Awards: The Harold H. Maynard Award (2006)
- Scientific career
- Institutions: Reichman University, Duke University, University of California, Davis
- Website: Prof. Eyal Biyalogorsky Website

Eyal Biyalogorsky (Hebrew: אייל בילוגורסקי) is a professor of Marketing and Deputy Dean at the Arison School of Business at the Reichman University. Biyalogorsky's research focusses on pricing, product management, product Marketing strategy and consumer referral management.

== Career ==
Biyalogorsky completed his BSc in Electrical Engineering from Tel-Aviv University in 1988. He completed his PhD from Fuqua School of Business at Duke University in Durham North Carolina in 1998. His PhD focussed on Business Administration and Marketing with his dissertation on ‘Bounded Rationality Competition’. Biyalogorsky is an active member of the academic community starting his teaching career from 1995 to 1997 at Duke University, teaching in a range of marketing and management programs. From 1999 to 2009 he held roles as a Professor of Marketing at University of California, Davis, lecturing on marketing management, pricing, business policy and product management.

Biyalogorsky joined Arison School of Business at Reichman University in 2008, as a Professor of Marketing, holding this role to today. In this role he lectures on a range of marketing subjects, including pricing policy. From the years of 2012–2017 Biyalogorsky held the position of Head of the Research MBA Program at Reichman University.

== Research ==
Research conducted by Biyalogorsky is in the area of pricing and product strategy, including customer referral management. Biyalogorsky's research focusses on the following primary areas:

- Customer referral management and developing rewards programs for active customers, some of this work has examined how firms can proactively influence customer word of mouth as part of the marketing mix, for example, through seeding programs that target influencers or by Referral programs
- New product marketing
- Online marketing strategies to develop higher offline sales

Hashai's research has been published in leading management, strategy, innovation and international business journals such as International Journal of Research in Marketing, Production and Operations Management, Marketing Science, Quantitative Marketing and Economics, Journal of Service Research, Journal of Marketing.

== Published works ==
(Partial List)

=== Selected articles ===
- Eyal Biyalogorsky, Amir Heiman, and Eitan Muller, The differential effects of time and usage on the brand premiums of automobiles, International Journal of Research in Marketing, 2021
- Eyal Biyalogorsky, and Oded Koenigsberg, The Design and Introduction of Product Lines When Consumer Valuations are Uncertain. Production and Operations Management. 23, 2013 doi:10.1111/poms.12167
- Yalcin, Taylan, Elie Ofek, Oded Koenigsberg, and Eyal Biyalogorsky, Complementary Goods: Creating, Capturing And Competing For Value, Marketing Science, 32, 2013, pp. 554–569 doi:10.1287/mksc.2013.0785
- Koenigsberg, Oded, Eyal Biyalogorsky, Elie Ofek, and Taylan Yalcin, Executive Summary: Never Mind the Complements, Where's the Value?, Business Strategy Review, 24, 2013 doi:10.1111/j.1467-8616.2013.00957.x
- Eyal Biyalogorsky, and Oded Koenigsberg, Ownership coordination in a channel: Incentives, returns, and negotiations, Quantitative Marketing and Economics. 8., 2010, pp. 461–490 doi:10.1007/s11129-010-9090-z
- Eyal Biyalogorsky, William Boulding, and Richard Staelin, Stuck in the Past: Why Managers Persist With New Product Failures, Journal of Marketing, American Marketing Associationm ISSN. 70, 2006, pp. 108–121 doi:10.1509/jmkg.70.2.108
- Eyal Biyalogorsky, Eitan Gerstner, Dan Weiss, and Jinhong Xie, The Economics of Service Upgrades, Journal of Service Research – J SERV RES. 7, 2005, pp. 234–244 doi:10.1177/1094670504271148
- Barak Libai, Eyal Biyalogorsky, and Eitan Gerstner, Setting Referral Fees in Affiliate Marketing., Journal of Service Research – J SERV RES. 5, 2003, pp. 303–315 doi:10.1177/1094670503005004003
- Eyal Biyalogorsky, Ziv Carmon, Gila Fruchter, and Eitan Gerstner, Research Note: Overselling with Opportunistic Cancellations, Marketing Science. 18, 1999, pp. 605–610 doi:10.1287/mksc.18.4.605

== Awards and recognitions ==
Biyalogorsky has received the following awards and honours for his teaching contributions: Teaching Excellence Award at Reichman University (2014), The Harold H. Maynard Award for the paper with most significant contribution to marketing theory and thought (2006), Professor of the Year at University of California, Davis (2000, 2002, 2003)
