= Renana Peres =

Israeli researcher

Prof. Renana Peres
- רננה פרס
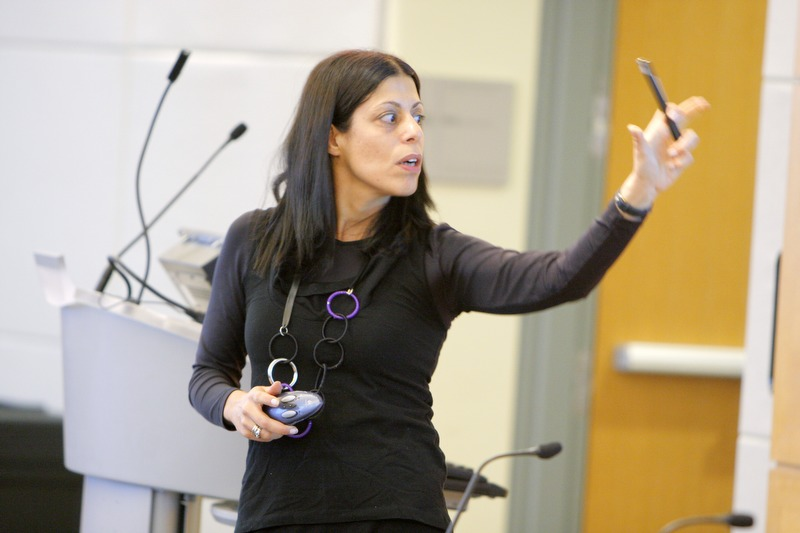
- Prof. Renana Peres
- Scientific career
- Fields: Marketing; Physics
- Workplaces: Hebrew University of Jerusalem 2006: PhD, Marketing; 2004: MBA; 1994: M.Sc. Physics 1991: B.Sc. Physics

Renana Peres (Hebrew: רננה פרס) is an Israeli researcher and a faculty member at the Jerusalem School of Business Administration at the Hebrew University of Jerusalem. She serves as a Visiting Assistant Professor of Marketing at The Wharton School at University of Pennsylvania. Peres is the founding CEO of PerSay Ltd. She is a member of the Editorial Board of Journal of Marketing Research and International Journal of Research in Marketing and has published her research in top academic and practitioner journals in the fields of marketing and management.

== Research ==
Peres' research focuses on different topics in the marketing field. These include brands, word-of-mouth, innovation diffusion and the evolution of markets for new products, social networks; complexity research and use of agent-based models for exploring market growth, seeding, industrial marketing, new product diffusion, B2B marketing, and CRM in growing markets.

Peres' research on brands and word-of-mouth aims to comprehend and recognise the richness of the phenomenon. Her research project compares word-of-mouth in different channels and connects it to brand characteristics through the brands' categories, products and brand attributes. Peres analyzes both offline (face-to-face and phone conversations) and online (blogs, user forums, and Twitter) as a means of generating word-of-mouth advertising and addressing the scarcity of knowledge about the online/offline dynamic. Peres' research interests in physics focus on neural networks brain modeling. Prior to her research in marketing, Peres explored the usage of neural network models for describing learning phenomena in the human visual cortex. Then she moved to develop algorithms and systems for voice-based verification. Peres has published her works in leading journals such as Journal of Marketing, Journal of Marketing Research, International Journal of Research in Marketing, Marketing Letters and The Economic Quarterly.

== Selected publications ==
=== Books ===
- Eitan Muller, Renana Peres, and Vijay Mahajan (2009), Innovation Diffusion and New Product Growth, Marketing Science Institute, relevant Knowledge Series, December 2009.

The book offers a first full review of all classic and more recent diffusion models and focuses on the mechanisms that underlie new product growth. Specifically, the book focuses on current market trends such as information proliferation, globalization, competition, social networks, and growth in service markets.

=== Selected articles ===
- Mitch Lovett, Ron Shachar and Renana Peres (2014) "A dataset of brands and their characteristics," Marketing Science.
- Renana Peres (2014) "The impact of network characteristics on the diffusion of innovations,” (2014) Physica A, 402 330-343.
- Mitch Lovett, Renana Peres, and Ron Shachar (2013) "On Brands and Word-of-Mouth", Journal of Marketing Research, 50 (4) 427-444.
- Stefan Stremersch, Renana Peres and Eitan Muller (2010), "Does New Product Growth Accelerate Across Technology Generations?" Marketing Letters, 21 (2) 103-120.
- Barak Libai, Eitan Muller and Renana Peres (2009), "The Diffusion of Services", Journal of Marketing Research, 46 (2) 163-175. Final nominee for the Paul Green award.
- Barak Libai, Eitan Muller and Renana Peres (2005), "The Role of Seeding in Multi-Market Entry", International Journal of Research in Marketing, 22(4), 375-393.

== Business leadership ==
After completing her Masters in Physics, Peres worked as a process engineer at Intel in Jerusalem. In 1995, she joined Comverse Technology as the head of research group at the Signal-Processing Department, and later was appointed the director of marketing of speech technologies and signal processing. The strength and sustainability of the voice-based technology she developed at Comverse led Peres to establish PerSay Ltd in 1999, a company that focuses on developing, promoting and marketing speaker recognition technologies. PerSay, which was a subsidiary of Comverse, develops systems which perform voice-based authentication of subscribers in applications of direct banking, telecommunication, and e-commerce. The company's products are server systems, based on unique in-house technology, and involve voice processing algorithms, hardware, and complex software architecture. Peres was the founder and CEO from 1999 to 2001. PerSay was acquired by Nuance Communications in 2010.
