= WeCU Technologies =

Israeli developer of a behavioural screening system

- Industry: Security, biometrics
- Founded: 2003
- Founders: Ehud Givon; Shlomo Breznitz; Boaz Ganor; Zipi Alster
- Headquarters: Israel
- Key people: Ehud Givon (CEO)
- Products: Behavioural screening system
- Number of employees: About 12 (2010)

WeCU Technologies (also written WeCu, a play on the phrase "we see you") is an Israeli technology company, founded in 2003, that developed an automated screening system intended to identify people concealing hostile intent. The system pairs methods drawn from the behavioural sciences with concealed biometric sensors: a subject is exposed to stimuli linked to a particular threat, and the resulting involuntary physiological and behavioural responses are measured and analysed.

The company demonstrated the technology to government bodies in Israel, the United States and Germany, and its development was supported by research grants from the Israeli Office of the Chief Scientist, the Transportation Security Administration and the Department of Homeland Security. After the attempted bombing of a Detroit-bound airliner in December 2009, the system received international press coverage as a prospective airport screening tool and was criticised by commentators and civil liberties advocates.

== History ==
WeCU was established in 2003. Chief executive Ehud Givon and behavioural scientist Zipi Alster conceived the project during the wave of suicide bombings in Israel that year, seeking a method of establishing intent without prior information about the subject and without a physical search. According to Givon, the Israeli defence industry was at that time concentrating on the early detection of explosives. Besides Givon and Alster, the founders included Shlomo Breznitz, a professor of psychology specialising in stress and a former member of the Knesset for Kadima, and Boaz Ganor, founder and executive director of the International Institute for Counter-Terrorism at the Interdisciplinary Center Herzliya.

The company worked with little publicity for its first years and still had no website in early 2010. It initially financed itself. In the months before May 2008, a private investor put three million dollars into the company, and by 2010 it described itself as 90 per cent self-funded, the remainder coming from government grants. By 2008 the system had been shown to government agencies in Israel, the United States and Germany and had attracted the interest of the Department of Homeland Security, which, together with the Transportation Security Administration, contributed grant funding. During Israel's sixtieth-anniversary year the company was named one of sixty firms expected to shape the country's future.

In 2008 the company expected mass production within two and a half years, at a projected cost of tens of thousands of dollars per unit, and intended to remain a technology licensor while a large security integrator handled deployment. The product was brought to market in late 2009, by which time the company employed about a dozen people in northern Israel. By mid-2010, the system had been under test in Israel for six months, and the company expected it to be ready for full deployment within a year. Givon declined to identify customers and said he was seeking partners in target countries to deal with government agencies. The company reported that the December 2009 attempt had made prospective buyers more willing to consider intrusive security measures.

== Technology ==
Unlike a polygraph or biometric systems built around the detection of emotional pressure, WeCU's system was not designed to establish whether a subject was lying, withholding information, under stress or feeling guilty. Instead it sought to detect an associative link between the subject and a predefined subject of interest. Givon described the underlying premise as follows: a person involved in or closely familiar with a given activity carries a set of associations relating to it, so that targeted stimuli – a photograph of an accomplice, objects from the scene of a crime, the emblem of the organisation on whose behalf the person acts, or an agreed code word – provoke an emotional and cognitive response, expressed as slight physiological and behavioural changes coinciding with the moment of exposure, whereas a person without such associations does not react significantly.

According to the company, the bank of stimuli is varied and their placement unpredictable, so that even a trained subject who is aware of the system cannot anticipate when, where or how they will appear. The system as described in 2008 had three parts: concealed biometric sensors that measure the subject remotely or during incidental contact, a subsystem that presents the stimuli, and a computerised subsystem for real-time analysis and decision-making. Screening was said to take under a minute, to require neither the subject's knowledge nor their cooperation, and to be carried out at points where checks are individual and run alongside other procedures such as passport control.

Press accounts from 2010 described an airport implementation built into an apparently ordinary check-in kiosk. Sensors first record baseline heart rate, body temperature and breathing rate; the traveller is then exposed to a near-invisible stimulus, one demonstration prompt being a check-in screen that asks the user to "enter name" while briefly flashing "enter real name"; a sensor registers eye movement, and an infrared camera reads the heat pattern of the blood vessels for comparison with the baseline. Results are passed to security staff by indicator lights, green for clear, red for a failed stimulus test and orange for an ambiguous reading. In an account published by the Associated Press, images such as symbols associated with a particular terrorist group were projected onto screens in the terminal; Givon illustrated the principle by observing that a traveller who unexpectedly saw a photograph of a relative could not help reacting, whether by a darting of the eyes, a faster heartbeat, a twitch or quickened breathing. Observation was to rely mainly on hidden cameras and sensors registering slight rises in body temperature and heart rate, with more sensitive remote instruments then under development to be added later, and travellers whose reactions were flagged would be taken aside for further screening.

Givon presented the product as a screening aid rather than a full-body polygraph or an advanced body scanner, one that reaches no final conclusion and cannot account for why a given physiological signal occurred, and said its distinguishing claim was the ability to separate the ill-intentioned from the merely anxious. In 2008 the system was at an early alpha stage awaiting a first commercial model, and had passed three trials: two in the laboratory and one field trial conducted by an Israeli security body. The automated analysis subsystem had not yet been built, so responses were interpreted by a human expert and analysis took two to three minutes, against a target detection time of 15 to 20 seconds; the company then claimed a detection rate above 90 per cent and said the system had still to be tested in more demanding field conditions involving crowds. In 2010 the company said that tests in the laboratory and in real-life settings with hundreds of subjects had shown 95 per cent of those flagged to be "persons of interest" whom the authorities would want to question.

== Reception ==
Reporting on proposals to change airport security after the December 2009 attempt, the Associated Press noted that some critics had called the approach Orwellian and likened it to brain fingerprinting, while civil libertarians compared attempts to read a person's thoughts to the film Minority Report, in which people are targeted for merely contemplating a crime. Fast Company observed that the company's name did little to allay such fears and that the system was likely to meet opposition from privacy advocates. The company replied that no records would be kept and suggested that officials settle privacy rules before putting the system into service, adding that for the great majority of travellers it would do no more than make travel safer and more efficient.

Givon stated that the system retained no records, held no prior information about the subject and kept no database of responses unless a reading gave cause for alarm. In a set of questions and answers published by TheMarker in 2008, the company rejected the description of its product as a "Big Brother" system, saying that it knows nothing about the subject and gathers no personal information before or after the check, that the result is binary, and that physiological readings are held only briefly and are not accumulated into a picture of a person over time. Asked whether it read minds, the company answered that it did not, and that it examined responses to stimuli specific to the intent being sought. It also stated that the system is not judicial, produces no criminal evidence and serves only to direct investigators towards a suspect for subsequent questioning, and that while a check can be performed without the subject's knowledge or consent, neither is necessary for the system to work.
