= Seeding trial =

Marketing research

A seeding trial or marketing trial is a form of marketing, conducted in the name of research, designed to target product sampling towards selected consumers. In the marketing research field, seeding is the process of allocating marketing to specific customers, or groups of customers, in order to stimulate the internal dynamics of the market, and enhance the diffusion process. In medicine, seeding trials are clinical trials or research studies in which the primary objective is to introduce the concept of a particular medical intervention—such as a pharmaceutical drug or medical device—to physicians, rather than to test a scientific hypothesis.

To create loyalty and advocacy towards a brand, seeding trials take advantage of opinion leadership to enhance sales, capitalizing on the Hawthorne Effect. In a seeding trial, the brand provides potential opinion leaders with the product for free, aiming to gain valuable pre-market feedback and also to build support among the testers, creating influential word-of-mouth advocates for the product. By involving the opinion leaders as testers, effectively inviting them to be an extension of the marketing department, companies can create "a powerful sense of ownership among the clients, customers or consumers that count" by offering engaging the testers in a research dialogue. Seeding trials in medicine are not illegal but are considered unethical because they "deceive investigators, clinicians, and patients, subverting the scientific process".

== In medicine ==
Seeding trials to promote a medical intervention were described as "trials of approved drugs [that] appear to serve little or no scientific purpose" and "thinly veiled attempts to entice doctors to prescribe a new drug being marketed by the company" in a special article in the New England Journal of Medicine. The article, whose authors included U.S. Food and Drug Administration commissioner David Aaron Kessler, also described a number of characteristics common to seeding trials:

- The trial is of an intervention with many competitors
- Use of a trial design unlikely to achieve its stated scientific aims (e.g., un-blinded, no control group, no placebo)
- Recruitment of physicians as trial investigators because they commonly prescribe similar medical interventions rather than for their scientific merit
- Disproportionately high payments to trial investigators for relatively little work
- Sponsorship is from a company's sales or marketing budget rather than from research and development
- Little requirement for valid data collection

An analysis of 34,398 industry-funded phase 3 and 4 trials posted on ClinicalTrials.gov from 1998 to 2024, covering seven therapeutic areas with confirmed seeding trials, found that 204 (0.59%) displayed marketing-driven characteristics when criteria such as low patient-to-site ratios and limited independent oversight were applied.

In a seeding trial, doctors and their patients are given free access to a drug and exclusive information and services to use the drug effectively. Additionally, participating physicians are often given financial remuneration and a chance to be a co-author on a resulting scientific publication. By triggering the Hawthorne effect, physicians become "opinion-leading word-of-mouth advocates". This practice has been shown to be effective.

Seeding trials are not illegal, but such practices are considered unethical. The obfuscation of true trial objectives (primarily marketing) prevents the proper establishment of informed consent for patient decisions. Additionally, trial physicians are not informed of the hidden trial objectives, which may include the physicians themselves being intended study subjects (such as in undisclosed evaluations of prescription practices). Seeding trials may also utilize inappropriate promotional rewards, which may exert undue influence or coerce desirable outcomes.

=== Examples ===
Documents released during a court case indicate that the Assessment of Differences between Vioxx and Naproxen To Ascertain Gastrointestinal Tolerability and Effectiveness (ADVANTAGE) trial of Vioxx conducted by Merck may have been a seeding trial, with the intention being to introduce the drug to physicians rather than test its efficacy. It appears Merck knew about the potential criticism they would face; an internal email suggested: "It may be a seeding study, but let's not call it that in our internal documents". The 2003 study was originally published in the Annals of Internal Medicine but was strongly criticized for its deception by the journal's editors in a 2008 editorial, calling for greater responsibility in academia to end the practice of "marketing in the guise of science".

In the STEPS trial Pfizer presented their drug Neurontin in a way that merged pharmaceutical marketing with research. This trial and other practices led to the company's loss in Franklin v. Parke-Davis.

== Regulatory oversight ==
No regulatory body currently conducts prospective monitoring for marketing-driven trial protocols; detection has depended on whistleblowers and litigation, which tend to uncover egregious cases rather than ambiguous ones. Regulatory standards vary across jurisdictions: the European Medicines Agency mandates registration and results reporting through EudraCT, while systems in low- and middle-income countries often remain less stringent, creating vulnerabilities that sponsors can exploit. Kang, Lin, and Chang argue that international harmonisation through the WHO and the International Council for Harmonisation is needed to prevent such regulatory arbitrage, and that platforms tracking industry payments to physicians, such as the U.S. Open Payments database, should be mandated in other jurisdictions.

== In marketing ==
Product Placement is an advertising technique used by companies to subtly promote their products through a non-traditional advertising technique, usually through appearances in film, television, or other media.

In the marketing field, seeding is considered the process of allocating marketing to specific customers, or groups of customers, in order to stimulate the internal dynamics of the market, enhance the diffusion process and encourage faster adoption of the product throughout the entire population. In a marketing seeding program, a company offers some sort of promotion (free product, discounts, service trials, etc.) to a niche group of people with the intention that this would stimulate WOM. An early example of a seeding trial was during the development of Post-it notes, produced by 3M. In 1977, secretaries to senior management staff throughout the United States were sent packs of Post-its and invited to suggest possible uses for them. They soon found them to be extremely useful and became "brand champions" for the product, an early example of viral marketing. Companies that have used seeding trials include Procter & Gamble, Microsoft, Hasbro, Google, Unilever, Pepsi, Coke, Ford, DreamWorks SKG, EMI, Sony, and Siemens.

Two of the main managerial decisions revolving around seeding focus on seeding of advertising in a multinational market and the process of seeding the product itself. Determining how many and which consumers within a particular social network should be seeded to maximize adoption is a challenging task for a firm.

=== Seeding strategies (how to seed?) ===
In 2005, a team of marketing researchers, Barak Libai, Eitan Muller and Renana Peres, found that, contrary to managerial intuition and common assumptions in marketing research, strategies that disperse marketing efforts are generally better strategies. These include 'support the weak', in which the firm focuses its marketing efforts on the remaining market potential, and 'uniform', in which the firm distributes the marketing efforts evenly among its regions. This conclusion is congruent with the work of Japanese business strategist Kenichi Ohmae, which suggests that the sprinkler business model is superior and recommended to companies wishing to start a seeding program.

Researchers Jeonghye Choi of Yonsei University, Sam Hui of Stern School of Business at New York University and David Bell of The Wharton School at the University of Pennsylvania, explored two imitation effects of the demand at an Internet retailer, geographic proximity and demographic similarity and concluded that firms can influence the space–time demand path through seeding. The researchers conceived a new seeding strategy called “Proximity-and-similarity-based strategy”, in which the firm seeds the new product by choosing new zip codes that are the most responsive while adjusting the impact of proximity and similarity effects over time, and compare it to the three strategies presented in Libai, Muller and Peres's research,“support the strong”, “support the weak” and “uniform”. They argue that with time, the “proximity-and similarity-based strategy” performs best because the similarity effect begins to affect new and distant areas. Namely, serving many small pools of similar buyers demographically, who are geographically distant from one another, is crucial for an Internet retailer because then sales increase over time.

Yogesh Joshi of University of Maryland, David Reibsteinand and John Zhang of Wharton Business School found that when the question of optimal entry timing arises, firms shouldn't necessarily enter a new market based on a strong leverage effect, a situation where a firm's presence in an existing market has a positive influence on product adoption in a new market. Also, a backlash effect shouldn't prevent the firm from entering a new market, a situation where social influence on the existing market is negative. Researchers show that the optimal strategy is a trade-off between the three factors of leverage, backlash, and patience.

=== Seeding objectives ===
One of the key questions surrounding seeding programs over the last decade has been whether or not it's more effective for companies to seed via influencers or random people through customers networks.

Many authors and scholars addressed this issue. Canadian journalist Malcolm Gladwell discuses the "Law of the Few" in his book, The Tipping Point. He suggests that highly connected and rare people have the ability to shape the world. This handful of unique people can spread the word around and create a social epidemic through their connections, charm, personality, expertise and persuasiveness. The notion that a small group of people can influence others and cause them to adopt products, services or behaviors was the subject of another book, The Influentials by Edward Keller and Jonathan Berry. This minority comprises a wide range of people who act as experts in their field and their opinions are highly regarded by their peers.

From a more academic point of view, Barak Libai, Eitan Muller and Renana Peres constructed a research in the subject which is among the first to shed light on the actual value created by word of mouth programs and explore issues such as how targeting opinion leaders creates more value than targeting random customers. In seeding programs, word-of-mouth can gain customers who would not otherwise have bought the product, this is called expansion. However, word-of-mouth can also accelerate the purchase process of customers who would have purchased anyway, the faster the adoption, the greater the profits. These processes of expansion and acceleration integrate to create social value in a word-of-mouth seeding program for a new product. Furthermore, when deciding upon an optimal seeding program, the researchers conclude that "influencer seeding programs" yield higher customer equity than "random seeding programs". Of course, the decision about which program type to adopt depends on how much the company is willing to invest in discovering their influencers.

German researchers Oliver Hinz of Universität Darmstadt, Bernd Skiera of University of Frankfurt, and Christian Barrot and Jan U. Becker of Kühne Logistics University, argue that seeding strategies have strong influence on the success of viral marketing campaigns. The results propose that seeding to well-connected people is the most successful approach because these attractive seeding points are more likely to participate in viral marketing campaigns. Well-connected people also actively use their greater reach but do not have more influence on their peers than do less connected people.

On the other side of the debate, some argue that influencers have no such effect and therefore companies shouldn't target their seeding efforts on a specific group of people. Duncan Watts and Peter Dodds examined the phenomenon through a computer network simulation under the assumption that influential people are more difficult to influence, therefore social hubs have a lower tendency to adopt new products. Their work suggests that highly connected individuals do not play a crucial role in influencing others and that a random individual is just as likely to start a trend as connected people.
