= Stefan Stremersch =

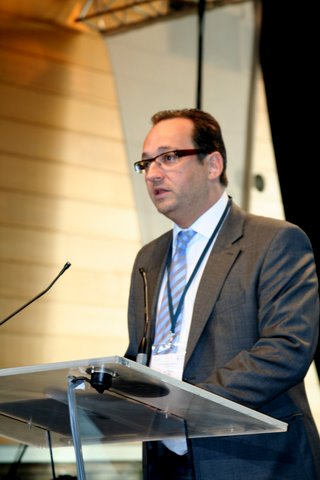
- Stremersch in 2009.
- Born: 1972 (age 53–54)
- Occupation: Professor
- Spouse: Els Van De Velde
- Children: Lauren Thibault Stremersch & Anne-Charlotte Stremersch

Academic work
- Institutions: Erasmus University Rotterdam
- Website: www.mti2.eu

Stefan Stremersch (born 1972) holds the Desiderius Erasmus Distinguished Chair of Economics and a Chair of Marketing, both at Erasmus University Rotterdam, the Netherlands and a Professor of Marketing at Ghent University, Belgium. His main research interests focus on innovation diffusion, marketing of technology and science, marketing strategy, new product growth, business economics of the life sciences and commercialization of new technologies. He is the scientific director of the Erasmus Healthcare Business Center and ECMI (European Center of Marketing and Innovation). Stremersch is also founder and managing partner at The Marketing Technology and Innovation Institute (MTI²), a consulting company focused on enabling people and firms to transform their innovation potential into commercial success.

== Career and awards ==
Prof. Stefan Stremersch teaches at all levels including bachelor's- and master's-level courses in Economics, bachelor's-level courses in Business, MBA, EMBA, Global MBA, and open programs (PLD, PMD). Stremersch teaches marketing, marketing strategy, marketing innovation, and marketing of high technology in IESE's MBA and executive education programs. Currently, he is affiliated with Erasmus University Rotterdam and Ghent University.

== Publications ==
=== Journal articles ===
- “The Bible of publishing: a perspective inspired by Don Lehmann,” (with with Marnik Dekimpe, Jacob Goldenberg, PK Kannan, Eitan Muller, Koen Pauwels, Roland T Rust, Martin Schreier, Jan-Benedict Steenkamp), International Journal of Research in Marketing, 2026, 43, 247-263.
- “The Effects of Mergers and Acquisitions on Marketing Decisions and Effectiveness: Evidence from the Biopharma Industry,” (with Vardit Landsman) Journal of Marketing Research, 2026, 63(2), 298-321.
- “Meta-Analysis of Advertising Effectiveness: New Insights from Improved Bias Corrections,” (with Joseph Korkames and Tom Stanley) International Journal of Research in Marketing, 2025, 43(1), 131-151.
- “The Rise of the Subscription Model in the Video Game Console Industry: Unveiling the Commercial Consequences for Platform Owners and Video Game Sellers,” (with Michiel Van Crombrugge) International Journal of Research in Marketing, 2025, 42, 1058-1083.
- “Engagement in Platform Markets: A (Video) Game Changer?” (with Michiel Van Crombrugge), Journal of the Academy of Marketing Science, 2025.
- “Customer Insights for Innovation: A Framework and Research Agenda for Marketing,” (with Nuno Camacho, Ivan Guitart, Elke Cabooter) Journal of the Academy of Marketing Science, 2025, 53 (1), 29-51.
- “The Detailing Response of Branded Drug Firms to Generic Entry,” (with Vijay Hariharan and Vardit Landsman) International Journal of Research in Marketing, 2024, 41 (3), 567-588.
- “How Can Academics Generate Great Research Ideas? Inspiration from Ideation Practice,” International Journal of Research in Marketing, 2024, 41 (1), 1-17.Lead article of the issue.
- “The Value of Context-Specific Studies for Marketing,” (with Jorge Gonzalez, Albert Valenti, and Julian Villanueva), Journal of the Academy of Marketing Science, 2023, 51, 50-65.
- “The Rise of New Technologies in Marketing: A Framework and Outlook,” (with Donna Hoffman, Page Moreau and Michel Wedel), Journal of Marketing, 2022, 86 (1), 1-6.
- “Grassroots Innovation Success: The Role of Self-Determination and Leadership Style,” (with Nuno Camacho, Elio Keko and Stefan Wuyts), International Journal of Research in Marketing, 2022, 39 (2), 396-414. Featured in UpNext Podcast
- “Financial Projections in Innovation Selection: The Role of Scenario Presentation, Expertise, and Risk,” (with Vardan Avagyan, Nuno Camacho and Wim Van der Stede), International Journal of Research in Marketing, 2022, 39(3), 907-926. Featured in LSE Business Review
- “Faculty Research Incentives and Business School Health: A New Perspective from and for Marketing,” (with Russ Winer and Nuno Camacho), Journal of Marketing, 2021, 85 (5), 1-21. Lead article of the issue. Featured in special webinar of the editors. Covered in numerous media outlets, such as Poets and Quants, Yahoo!Finance, AACSB, THE (Times Higher Education), etc.
- “The Impact of Informational and Emotional Television Ad Content on Online Search and Sales,” (with Ivan Guitart), Journal of Marketing Research, 2021, 58 (2), 299-320.
- “The Study of Important Marketing Issues: Reflections,” International Journal of Research in Marketing, 2021, 38 (1), 12-17. (invited)
- “The Commercial Consequences of Collective Layoffs: Close the Plant, Lose the Brand?” (with Vardit Landsman), Journal of Marketing, 2020, 84 (3), 122-141. Covered in IESE Insight, MaeKyung Business Daily (700,000 subscribers).
- “Inspire, Diverge, Converge: Three Steps to Better Decisions,”, IESE Insight, 2019, 153, 62-69.
- “Gear Manufacturers as Contestants in Sport Competitions: Breeding and Branding Returns”, with Yvonne van Everdingen and Vijay G. Hariharan, Journal of Marketing, 2019.
- “Tournaments to Crowdsource Innovation: The Role of Moderator Feedback and Participation Intensity,” with Nuno Camacho, Hyoryung Nam, P.K. Kannan, Journal of Marketing, 2019.
- “Advertising non-premium products as if they were premium: The impact of advertising up on advertising elasticity and brand equity,”(with Ivan Guitart and Jorge Gonzalez), International Journal of Research in Marketing, 2018, 35(3), 471–489.
- “Predicting the consequences of marketing policy changes: A new data enrichment method with competitive reactions,” (with Eelco Kappe and Sriram Venkataraman), Journal of Marketing Research, 2017, 54(5) 720–736.
- “Drug Detailing and Doctors’ Prescription Decisions: The Role of Information Content in the Face of Competitive Entry”, (with Eelco Kappe), Marketing Science, 2016, 35(6), 915–933.
- “Introduction to the IJRM Special Issue on Marketing and Innovation”, (with Gui Liberali, Eitan Muller and Ronald T. Rust), International Journal of Research in Marketing, 2015, 32(3), 235–237.
- “Unraveling Scientific Impact: Citation Types in Marketing Journals”, (with Nuno Camacho, Sofie Vanneste and Isabel Verniers), International Journal of Research in Marketing, 2015, 32(1), 64–77.
- “Variable Selection in International Diffusion Models,” (with Sarah Gelper), International Journal of Research in Marketing, 2014, 31(4), 356-367.
- “The Effect of Customer Empowerment on Adherence to Expert Advice,” (with Nuno Camacho and Martijn de Jong), International Journal of Research in Marketing, 2014, 31(3), 293-308.
- “Rejoinder: From Academic Research to Marketing Practice: Some Further Thoughts” (with John Roberts and Ujwal Kayande), International Journal of Research in Marketing, 2014, 31 (2), 144-146.
- “From Academic Research to Marketing Practice: Exploring the Marketing Science Value Chain,” (with John Roberts and Ujwal Kayande), International Journal of Research in Marketing, 2014, 31 (2), 127-140. Lead article with commentaries by Russ Winer and Don Lehmann. Winner IJRM Best Paper Award 2014. Winner ERIM Top Article Award 2015. Selected as Editor’s Top Choice Article. Top-downloaded IJRM article of all times (nr. 1 in 2015, nr. 2 in 2016, nr. 3 in 2017, nr. 3 in 2018)
- “The Commercial Contribution of Clinical Studies for Pharmaceutical Drugs,” (with Ashish Sood and Eelco Kappe), International Journal of Research in Marketing, 2014, 31(1), 65-77.
- “The Relationship between DTCA, Drug Requests and Prescriptions: Uncovering Variation in Specialty and Space”, (with Vardit Landsman & Sriram Venkataraman), Marketing Science, 2013, 32 (1), 89-110.
- “Analysis of Sensitive Questions Across Cultures: An Application of Multigroup Item Randomized Response Theory to Sexual Attitudes and Behavior”, (with Martijn de Jong & Rik Pieters), Journal of Personality and Social Psychology, 2012, 103 (3), 543-564.
- "Dynamics in International Market Segmentation of New Product Growth", (with Aurélie Lemmens & Christophe Croux), International Journal of Research in Marketing, 2012, 29 (1), 81-92. Winner IJRM Best Paper Award 2012.
- "Multi-Homing in Two-Sided Markets: An Empirical Inquiry in the Video Game Console Industry", (with Vardit Landsman), Journal of Marketing, 2011, 75 (November), 39-52.
- "The Global Entry of New Pharmaceuticals: A Joint Investigation of Launch Window and Price", (with Isabel Verniers & Christophe Croux), International Journal of Research in Marketing, 2011, 28 (4), 295-308.
- “Predictably Non-Bayesian: Quantifying Salience Effects in Physician Learning about Drug Quality”, (with Nuno Camacho and Bas Donkers), Marketing Science, 30 (2), 2011, 305-320. Dissertation-based paper of Nuno Camacho.
- “Does New Product Growth Accelerate across Technology Generations”, (with Eitan Muller and Renana Peres), Marketing Letters, 21 (2), 2010, 103-120.
- “The Evolving Social Network of Marketing Scholars”, (with Jacob Goldenberg, Barak Libai, and Eitan Muller), Marketing Science, 29 (3), 2010, 561–567.
- “Marketing of the Life Sciences: A New Framework and Research Agenda for a Nascent Field”, (with Walter Van Dyck), Journal of Marketing, 73 (4), 2009, 4-30. Lead article of the issue. Featured article on the JM blog (only one in this issue).
- “Modeling Global Spill-Over in New Product Takeoff,” (with Yvonne Van Everdingen and Dennis Fok), Journal of Marketing Research, October 2009. Winner ERIM Top Article Award 2010.
- “The Effect of Superstar Software on Hardware Sales in System Markets,” (with Jeroen L.G. Binken), Journal of Marketing, 73 (March), 2009, 88-104.
- “Sales Growth of New Pharmaceuticals Across the Globe: The Role of Regulatory Regimes,” (with Aurélie Lemmens), Marketing Science, 28 (4), 2009, 690-708.
- “The Debate on Influencing Doctors’ Decisions: Are Drug Characteristics the Missing Link?” (with Sriram Venkataraman), Management Science, 53 (11), 2007, 1688-1701.
- “The Quest for Citations: Drivers of Article Impact” (with Isabel Verniers and Peter C. Verhoef), Journal of Marketing, 71 (3), 2007, 171-193.
- “Indirect Network Effects in New Product Growth”, (with Gerard Tellis, Philip Hans Franses and Jeroen L.G. Binken), Journal of Marketing, 71 (3), 2007, 52-74.
- “Customizing Complex Products: When Should the Vendor Take Control?” (with Mrinal Ghosh and Shantanu Dutta), Journal of Marketing Research, 43 (November), 2006, 664-679.
- “Globalization of Authorship in the Marketing Discipline: Evolution, Country Productivity and Consequences”, (with Peter C. Verhoef), Marketing Science, 24 (4), 2005, 585-594.
- “Marketing Mass Customized Products: Striking the Balance between Utility and Complexity”, (with Benedict G.C. Dellaert), Journal of Marketing Research, 42 (May), 2005, 219-227.
- “Understanding and Managing International Growth of New Products”, (with Gerard J. Tellis), International Journal of Research in Marketing, 21 (4), 2004, 421-438. Winner of the MSI&IJRM Research Competition on Global Marketing 2003. Finalist AMA TechSIG Best Paper Award 2005. Finalist of the Jan-Benedict Steenkamp Award for Long Term Impact, 2014.
- “Vertical Marketing Systems for Complex Products: A Triadic Perspective”, (with Stefan Wuyts, Christophe Van den Bulte and Philip Hans Franses), Journal of Marketing Research, 41 (November), 2004, 479-487.
- “Social Contagion and Income Heterogeneity in New Product Diffusion: A Meta-Analytic Test”, (with Christophe Van den Bulte), Marketing Science, 23 (4), 2004, 530-544. Winner ERIM Top Article Award 2005. Marketing Science Long Term Impact Award Finalist, 2013 & 2014.
- “Portfolios of Interfirm Agreements in Technology-Intensive Markets: Consequences for Innovation and Profitability”, (with Stefan Wuyts and Shantanu Dutta), Journal of Marketing, 68 (2), 2004, 88-100.
- “Buying Modular Systems in Technology-Intensive Markets”, (with Allen M. Weiss, Benedict G.C. Dellaert and Ruud T. Frambach), Journal of Marketing Research, 40 (3), 2003, 335-350. Finalist AMA TechSig Best Paper Award 2004.
- “The International Takeoff of New Products: The Role of Economics, Culture, and Country Innovativeness”, (with Gerard J. Tellis and Eden Yin), Marketing Science, 22 (2), 2003, 188-208. Discussed in numerous newspapers, journals and newswires nationally and abroad – such as The Economist, Sloan Management Review, Het Financieel Dagblad, De Financieel Economische Tijd. Winner ERIM Impact Award 2004. Winner Global Marketing Award, American Marketing Association, 2006. Most Highly Cited Paper Published in Marketing Science in the 2003 volume (2005, 2006). Marketing Science Long Term Impact Award Finalist, 2009 & 2010.
- “Strategic Bundling of Products and Prices: A New Synthesis For Marketing”, (with Gerard J. Tellis), Journal of Marketing, 66 (January), 2002, 55-72. Winner of the 2002 Harold H. Maynard Best Paper Award. Top-3 of most readable articles (as mentioned in: Sawyer, Laran and Xu, Journal of Marketing, January 2008).
- “The Purchasing of Full-Service Contracts: An Exploratory Study within the Industrial Maintenance Market”, (with Stefan Wuyts & Ruud T. Frambach), Industrial Marketing Management, 30 (1), 2001, 1-12.

=== Books ===
- Stremersch, S. & Tindemans, E.B. (2007). Verlicht Ondernemen. Leuven (Belgie) en Rotterdam (Nederland): Lannoo Campus/Scriptum.
- Ding, M., Eliashberg, J. & Stremersch, S. (2014). Innovation and Marketing in the Pharmaceutical Industry: Emerging Practices, Research, and Policies. Springer.
- Stremersch S., (2016). "Kiezen voor Winst", Boom: ISBN 978-9-0244-0427-8, www.kiezenvoorwinst.nl (How Winners Make Choices in English)

=== Book chapters ===
- “The What, Who and How of Innovation Generation”, (with Elio Keko and Gert Jan Prevo), in Handbook of Research on New Product Development (edited by Peter Golder and Debanjan Mitra), Edward Elgar, ISBN 978-1-7847-1814-5 (2018)
- “The Successful Launch and Diffusion of New Therapies”, In M. Ding, J. Eliashberg & S. Stremersch (Eds.), Innovation and Marketing in the Pharmaceutical Industry: Emerging Practices, Research, and Policies. Springer. (with Vardit Landsman and Isabel Verniers), ISBN 978-1-4614-7800-3, (2014), 189–223.
- “Grassroots Innovation: A Promising Innovation Paradigm for Pharmaceutical Companies”, In M. Ding, J. Eliashberg & S. Stremersch (Eds.), Innovation and Marketing in the Pharmaceutical Industry: Emerging Practices, Research, and Policies. Springer. (with Ulrich Betz, Nuno Camacho and Michael Gerards), ISBN 978-1-4614-7800-3, (2014), 119–148.
- “The Connected Patient”, In The Book on the Connected Customer, Tilburg Lustrum, in press. (with Nuno Camacho and Vardit Landsman), ISBN 978-1-84872-837-0, January 2010, 107–139.
