= Rafi Melnick =

Israeli economist and academic administrator

- רפי מלניק
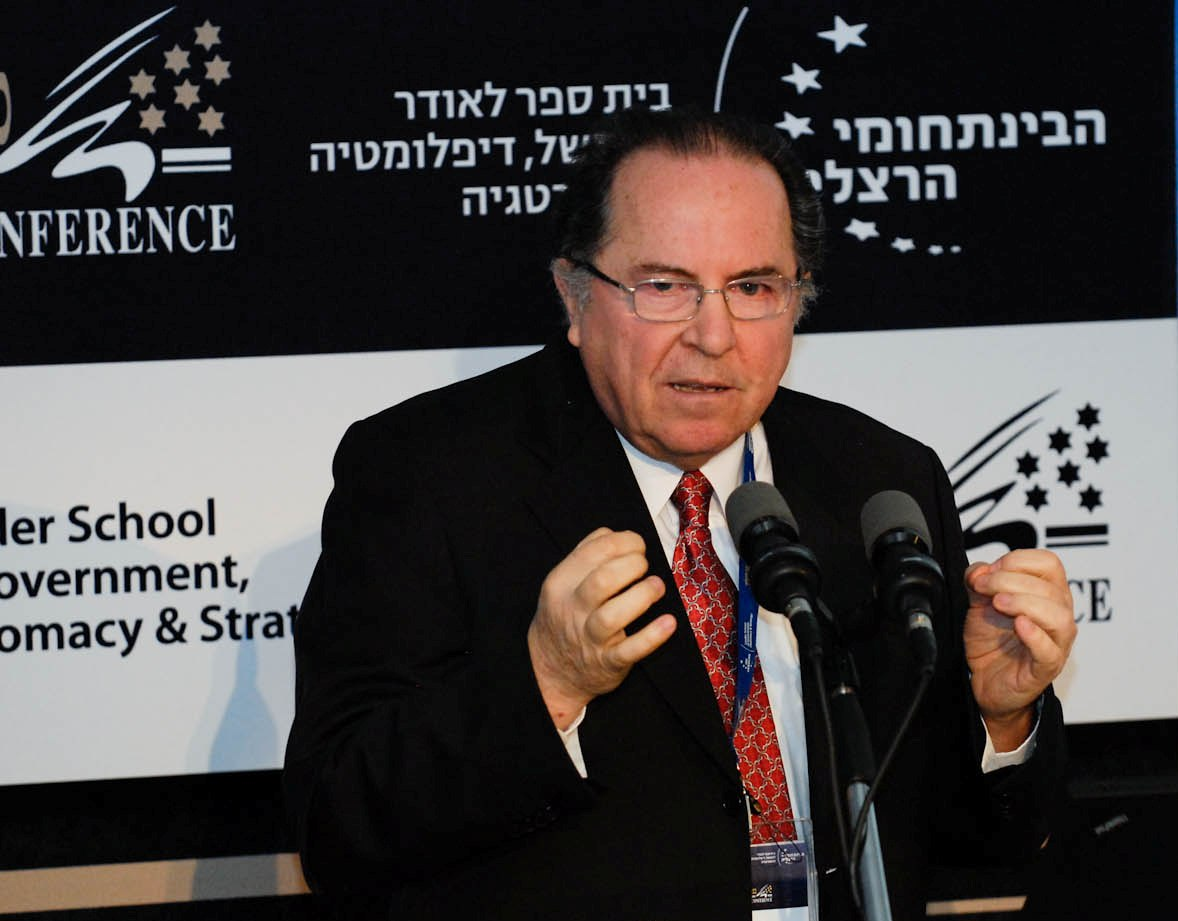
- Melnick in 2010

2nd President of Reichman University
- In office December 2021 – September 2023
- Preceded by: Uriel Reichman

Personal details
- Born: 1946/1947 (age 78–79)
- Education: Hebrew University of Jerusalem; University of California, Berkeley

Rafi Melnick (Hebrew: רפי מלניק; born 1946/1947) is an Israeli economist and academic administrator who served as president of Reichman University from 2021 to 2023.

== Biography ==
Rafi Melnick was born in 1946 or 1947. He completed a B.A. in economics and statistics and a M.A. in economics from the Hebrew University of Jerusalem. He earned a Ph.D. in economics from the University of California, Berkeley in 1979. His dissertation was titled, An Econometric Study of Consumption with Unobservables.

== Academic career ==
Melnick was a member of the economic council advisory committee of the Prime Minister of Israel's office. He served as deputy director of research and a member of the monetary committee at the Bank of Israel. He was a lecturer at the Hebrew University of Jerusalem. Melnick's research focuses on economy of Israel, monetary economics, and applied econometrics.

In 1998, he joined the faculty at Reichman University, serving as a professor in its Tiomkin School of Economics and the Lauder School of Government, Diplomacy and Strategy. Melnick founded the Tiomkin School and served as dean of the Lauder School. He later served as the vice president of academic affairs. In September 2021, he was named acting president following the retirement of founding president Uriel Reichman. Melnick was appointed president in December that year. His term ended in September 2023, when he was succeeded by Boaz Ganor.
