= Elie Ofek =

Israeli-American economist

Elie Ofek (Hebrew: אלי אופק) is an Israeli-American economist currently at Harvard Business School.

== Published works ==
Ofek has more than 290 publications, with an h-index of 50.

(Partial List)

=== Books ===
- Elie Ofek, Barak Libai, Eitan Muller, Innovation Equity: Assessing and Managing the Monetary Value of New Products and Services, University of Chicago Press, 2016

Harvard Business School Cases:

- Elie Ofek, Barak Libai, Eitan Muller, Customer Lifetime Social Value (CLSV), 2021
- Elie Ofek, Barak Libai, Eitan Muller, Customer Management Dynamics and Cohort Analysis, 2020
- Elie Ofek, Barak Libai, Eitan Muller, Ride-Hailing Services: Forecasting Uber's Growth, 2019

=== Selected articles ===
- Taylan Yalcin, Elie Ofek, Oded Koenigsberg, Eyal Biyalogorsky, Complementary Goods: Creating, Capturing And Competing For Value, Marketing Science, 32, 2013, pp. 554-569 doi:10.1287/mksc.2013.0785
- Oded Koenigsberg, Eyal Biyalogorsky, Elie Ofek, Taylan Yalcin, Executive Summary: Never Mind the Complements, Where's the Value?, Business Strategy Review, 24, 2013 doi:10.1111/j.1467-8616.2013.00957.x
