= Ron Shachar =

Israeli professor

Prof. Ron Shachar
- רון שחר
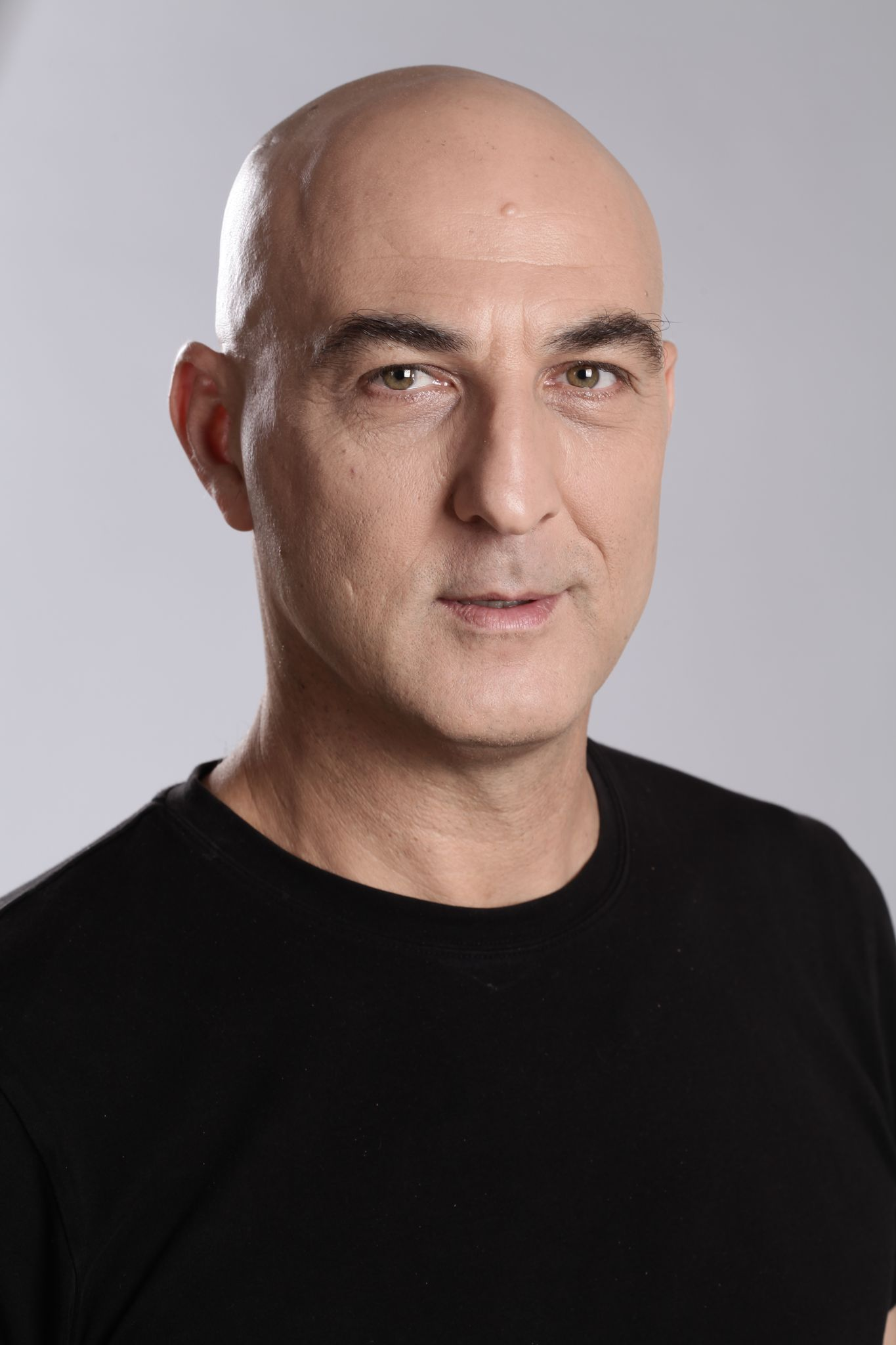
- Born: Tel Aviv, Israel
- Citizenship: Israel
- Education: BEc (1986), Master of Economics (1988), and PhD (1992 in Economics) from Tel Aviv University
- Awards: Dick Wittink Award – Honorable Mention, 2008, International Journal of Research in Marketing – Best Article, 2020
- Scientific career
- Workplaces: Reichman University, Tel Aviv University, Harvard University, Yale University, Columbia University, New York University, Duke University
- Website: Prof. Ron Shachar Website

Prof. Ron Shachar (Hebrew: רון שחר; born as Ron Schwartzman; Tel Aviv, Israel) is an Israeli professor and researcher in the fields of economics, marketing, and storytelling. His research deals with branding and advertising with a focus on the entertainment industry (e.g., television and film) and political elections. Today, he serves as Head of the Business Honors Program at the Arison School of Business, Reichman University. Prof. Shachar previously served as a faculty member at Tel Aviv University, Yale University, and as the Dean of the Arison School of Business at Reichman University.

== Career ==
Prof. Shachar was born and raised in Ramat Gan, and is a graduate of Blich High School. He completed a Bachelor of Economics in 1986 and Master of Economics in 1988, and his PhD in Economics in 1992, from Tel Aviv University, he studied his PhD at the Massachusetts Institute of Technology. After completing his doctorate and post-doctorate at Harvard University he joined the faculty of Yale University in the School of Business Administration from 1992 to 1997. In 1997 he returned to Israel, and taught at Tel Aviv University. Between the years 2004–2010 he served as head of the marketing specialty, and was elected as an outstanding lecturer, in 2006 he was appointed an associate professor and in 2009 as a full professor. in the years 2004–2010 he was a visiting professor at Duke University. In 2011 he moved to Arison School of Business at the Reichman University, and served as Dean of the Arison School of Business at Reichman University from 2011 to 2014, and since 2013 has served as Head of the Business Honors Program at the Arison School of Business. Prof. Shachar also serves as a visiting professor at Columbia University in Manhattan, and since 2019 also serves as a visiting professor at New York University.

Shachar has held professional positions within the political system in Israel. In 1989, he served as economic advisor to Deputy Finance Minister Yossi Beilin, and in 1992 he served as a member of Yitzhak Rabin's 100-day team. Shachar served as a surveyor and strategist for the Meretz party in the Israeli general election in 1999 and 2003, as well as a political commentator on television channels: Channel 1 (Israel) and Channel two. Shachar has advised a variety of leading companies in the United States, including the television network CBS and the World Bank, and has served as a consultant to Keshet Broadcasting and various advertising companies in Israel.

== Research ==
Shachar researches in the fields of advertising, branding, marketing, and politics. His research deals with strategies and marketing in the entertainment industries, film, and television, political elections, brands and advertising.

His research focuses on positive aspects of branding and advertising for consumers. While previous studies have described branding and advertising processes as changing consumer preferences, Shachar's research has shown that branding and advertising can provide information to consumers and, as a result, give rise to smarter consumer decisions. Shachar's research on branding and brands also focuses on the ability of these to serve consumers in building and expressing their personalities and identities. In this context two of his papers show the connection between brands and religious belief. According to empirical findings, the use of brands weakens religious belief and the need to participate in religious activity. One of his studies focuses on a different aspect of marketing—identifying which brands are gaining popularity on social networks and private conversations and how brands can encourage this activity.

His research on elections and political campaigns employs analytical tools from the economics field to explore the psychological and social dimensions of political elections. His research demonstrates that participation in elections is influenced by habitual processes. In recent years, his research has focused on stories and storytelling. His research illustrates the psychological aspects of storytelling – the higher the person's ability to tell a story, the higher a person's sense of meaning and purpose. Additional areas of research demonstrates how advertising messages can become particularly effective when they incorporate narrative elements.

Prof. Shachar has held a number of senior editorial positions in international journals. His research has been published in leading journals such as: American Economic Review, Marketing Science, Journal of Marketing Research, International Journal of Research in Marketing, RAND Journal of Economics, Journal of Experimental Psychology: General, and the American Journal of Political Science. Prof. Shachar has, or currently acts as an editorial board member in prominent journals including: Journal of Marketing Research, Quantitative Marketing and Economics, International Journal of Research in Marketing, Marketing Science, Journal of Marketing Behaviour, and Applied Economics Research Bulletin.

Shachar served as a reporter and editor for several newspapers in Israel and also wrote three books. In 2001, a reference book was published that detailed political marketing strategies under the name Leader by Invitation. In 2006, he published a suspense novel titled Serendipity. In 2018, he wrote the novel X in the Middle, which went on to become a bestseller.

== Awards and recognitions ==
In 2008, Prof. Shachar received the Dick Wittink Award—Honorable Mention. In 2018, one of his articles reached the O'Dell Award final, and in 2020 he received the award for best article in the International Journal of Research in Marketing.

== Published works ==
Shachar has published over 50 peer review articles with a h-index of 23. (Partial List)

=== Books ===
- Invited Leader: On Voters and Strategies of Political Marketing, Yedioth Ahronoth Publishing, 2001 (Hebrew)
- Serendipity, IQ Publishing, 2006 (Hebrew)
- X in the middle, Yedioth Books Publishing, 2018 (Hebrew)

=== Selected articles ===
- Mario Mikulincer, Ron Shachar, Is Storytelling Ability Related to the Sense of Meaning in Life?
- Cutright, Keisha, Tülin Erdem, Gavan J. Fitzsimons and Ron Shachar, Finding Brands and Losing Your Religion, Journal of Experimental Psychology: General, 143(6), 2014, pp. 2209–2222
- MJ Lovett, R Peres, R Shachar, On brands and word of mouth, Journal of marketing research 50 (4), 2013, pp, 427–444
- BN Anand, R Shachar, Advertising, the matchmaker, The RAND Journal of Economics 42 (2), 2011, pp. 205–245
- BN Anand, R Shachar, Brands as beacons: A new source of loyalty to multiproduct firms, Journal of marketing Research 41 (2), 2004, pp. 135–150
- Alan S. Gerber, Donald P. Green, Ron – Shachar, Voting May Be Habit‐Forming: Evidence from a Randomized Field Experiment, American Journal of Political Science 47(3), 2003, pp. 540 – 550 doi:10.1111/1540-5907.00038
- Ronald Goettler, Ron Shachar, Spatial Competition in the Network Television Industry, The RAND Journal of Economics 32(4), 2001, pp. 624–56 doi:10.2139/ssrn.275025
- Ron Shachar and Barry Nalebuff, Follow the Leader: Theory and Evidence on Political Participation, The American Economic Review, Vol. 89, No. 3, 1999, pp. 525–547

== Personal life ==
Shachar was previously married to Professor Idit Shachar of The Weizmann Institute of Science, and have two children. He is currently in a relationship with Tal Raz and they have a daughter.
