= Anat Berko =

Israeli criminologist and politician

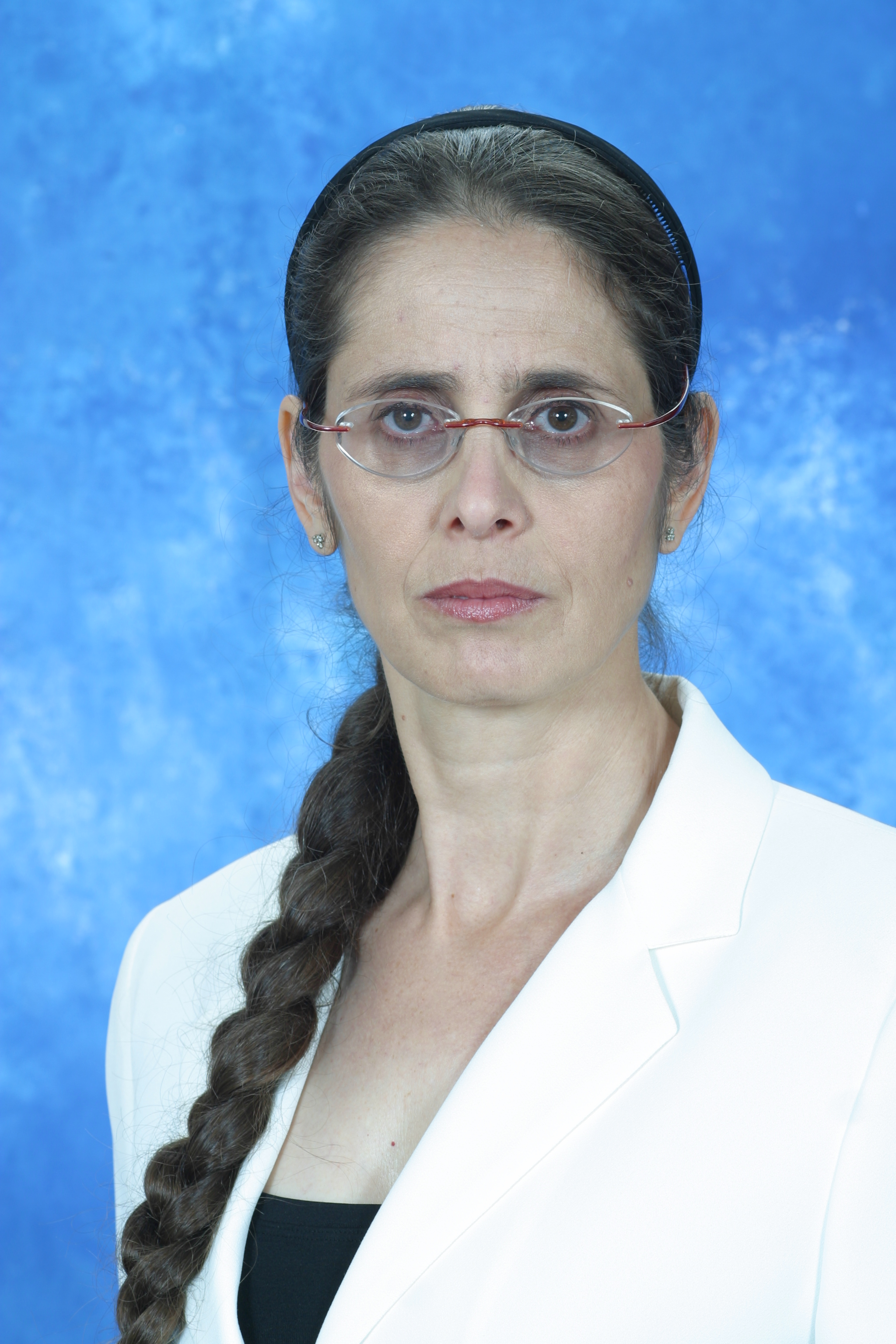
- Berko in 2015

Faction represented in the Knesset
- 2015–2019: Likud

Personal details
- Born: 14 January 1960 (age 66) Jerusalem, Israel

Anat Berko (Hebrew: ענת ברקו; born 14 January 1960) is an Israeli criminologist and politician. An expert in the fields of counter-terrorism, she served as a member of the Knesset for Likud between 2015 and 2019.

== Biography ==
Berko was born in Jerusalem to Jewish parents who had immigrated to Israel from Iraq, and was the second of six children. After completing her national service, she remained in the Israel Defense Forces, serving for a total of 25 years and reaching the rank of lieutenant colonel. She studied psychology, sociology and criminology at Bar-Ilan University and holds a PhD in criminology, her doctorate thesis was about suicide bombers with emphasis on female and child Palestinian suicide bombers. She became a lecturer at the Lauder School of Government of the Interdisciplinary Center Herzliya, and served as a visiting professor at George Washington University. Nowadays she is a research fellow at the International Institute for Counter-Terrorism (ICT) and lectures at Israel's National Defense College. Her research area includes suicide bombings, and she interviewed Hamas leader Ahmed Yassin.

== Political career ==
Prior to the 2015 Knesset elections she was placed 23rd on the Likud list, a slot reserved for a candidate chosen by Netanyahu. She was elected to the Knesset as Likud won 30 seats. In February 2016, she claimed that the term 'Palestine' is borrowed as Arabic does not have a 'p' sound. In August 2018 she proposed a bill to ban displays of the Palestinian flag, with violators facing up to one year in prison.

Berko was moved down to forty-sixth place on the Likud list for the April 2019 elections. Likud won 35 seats, resulting in Berko losing her place in the Knesset.

Berko is married to Reuven, an expert on Arab affairs, and has three children.

== Books ==
- The Path to Paradise: The Inner World of Suicide Bombers and their Dispatchers, 2009, Praeger Publishers, 978-1-5979-7364-9
- The Smarter Bomb, Women and Children as Suicide Bombers 2011, Rowman & Littlefield, 978-1-4422-1952-6
