= Haresh Gurnani =

Indian-American academic administrator and professor

Dean of the Stony Brook University College of Business
- Incumbent
- Assumed office July 2023
- Preceded by: Manny London

Personal details
- Education: Indian Institute of Technology; Carnegie Mellon University

Haresh Gurnani is an Indian-American academic administrator, professor and current dean of the Stony Brook University College of Business since July 2023. Prior to joining Stony Brook, he held multiple leadership positions at Wake Forest University, including serving as area chair of Business Analytics, Operations Management, Marketing, and Economics in the School of Business.

== Early life and education ==
Haresh Gurnani earned a bachelor's degree in mechanical engineering from the Indian Institute of Technology, followed by a master's and doctorate in operations research from Carnegie Mellon University.

== Career ==
Gurnani's was appointed as Dean of the College of Business at Stony Brook University in July 2023, following his time at Wake Forest University. At Wake Forest, his roles included area chair of Business Analytics, Operations Management, Marketing, and Economics, as well as holding the Thomas H. Davis Chair. Prior to Wake Forest, Gurnani chaired the Department of Management at the University of Miami, contributing to various university councils and boards.

== Research ==
Gurnani's work spans a range of areas including operations and supply chain analytics, retail distribution channel design and marketing, healthcare operations and marketing, sharing economy, and sustainability. He has been published in prominent journals such as Management Science, Marketing Science, Journal of Marketing Research, Production and Operations Management, and the Journal of International Business Studies.

=== Selected publications ===
- Gurnani, H.; Tang, C. S. (1999). "Note: Optimal ordering decisions with uncertain cost and demand forecast updating". Management Science. 45 (10): 1456–1462. doi:10.1287/mnsc.45.10.1456.
- Gurnani, H.; Gerchak, Y. (2007). "Coordination in decentralized assembly systems with uncertain component yields". European Journal of Operational Research. 176 (3): 1559–1576. doi:10.1016/j.ejor.2005.10.040.
- Tang, S. Y.; Gurnani, H.; Gupta, D. (2014). "Managing disruptions in decentralized supply chains with endogenous supply process reliability". Production and Operations Management. 23 (7): 1198–1211. doi:10.1111/poms.12160.
- Gurnani, H.; Shi, M. (2006). "A bargaining model for a first-time interaction under asymmetric beliefs of supply reliability". Management Science. 52 (6): 865–880. doi:10.1287/mnsc.1050.0498.
