= Barak Libai =

Professor of Marketing

Prof Barak Libai
- ברק ליבאי
- Citizenship: Israel
- Education: BSc in industrial engineering and management from the Technion, 1990. MBA at Leon Recanati Graduate School of Business Administration – Tel Aviv University, 1993. PhD in marketing at UNC Kenan–Flagler Business School, University of North Carolina at Chapel-Hill, 1997
- Awards: International Journal of Research in Marketing (2021), Journal of Marketing Outstanding Reviewer Award (2019), International Conference on Information Systems (ICIS) – Best Paper Award (2012), ESOMAR Excellence Award (2009), Journal of Service Research Best Paper Award (2004), Buzzell Award by the Marketing Science Institute (2004), Best Service Article Award – American Marketing Association (2004)
- Scientific career
- Institutions: Reichman University, University of North Carolina, Technion – Israel Institute of Technology, Massachusetts Institute of Technology
- Website: https://www.idc.ac.il/en/pages/faculty.aspx?username=libai

Barak Libai (Hebrew: ברק ליבאי) is an Israeli academic. He is currently professor of Marketing at the Arison School of Business at Reichman University. Libai's research focusses on the strategic importance of customer profitability, word of mouth and other social effects on profitability, customer retention, and the Diffusion of innovations.

== Career ==
Libai is the son of the late Avinoam Libai, an aerospace engineering professor who was awarded the Israel Prize of Engineering research, and Yona Libai a lecturer of teacher education in various academic institutes.

Libai received his BSc in industrial engineering and management from the Technion in 1990, and his MBA at Leon Recanati Graduate School of Business Administration – Tel Aviv University in 1993. In 1997, he completed his PhD in marketing at UNC Kenan–Flagler Business School, University of North Carolina at Chapel-Hill. Libai has held marketing academic positions at the Industrial Engineering and Management faculty of the Technion and the Faculty of Management at Tel Aviv University.

In 2011 he moved to the Arison School of Business at the Reichman University. He was also a visiting associate professor of marketing at the Massachusetts Institute of Technology Sloan School of Management.

== Research ==
Libai's research focusses on the intersection of customer profitability analysis, the diffusion of innovations, and the impact analysis of the social influence of customers. His research shows the role of Customer equity, the sum of the individual lifetime value of customers, as one of the most important business measures of the firm and a key parameter to any customer-related resource allocation.

Libai's research focuses on customer social value, ways to assess it, and how it can influence managerial decision-making. His work has also examined various ways in which social influence namely word of mouth, network effects, imitation, and social norms (such as fashions) can affect the growth of new products and the profitability of the firm. Some of this work has examined how firms can proactively influence customer word of mouth as part of the marketing mix, for example, through seeding programs that target influencers or by referral programs.

Other work dealt with various issues related to customer profitability particularly in new digital environments, such as models for the monetization of mobile apps, the role of customer retention in the firm's profitability, and the network value products create.

Libai is member of the editorial board of several academic journals including Journal of Marketing, International Journal of Research in Marketing, Journal of Service Research, and California Management Review.

== Published works ==
Libai has more than 89 publications, and has an h-index of 30.

(Partial List)

=== Books ===
- Elie Ofek, Barak Libai, Eitan Muller, Innovation Equity: Assessing and Managing the Monetary Value of New Products and Services, University of Chicago Press, 2016

Harvard Business School Cases:

- Elie Ofek, Barak Libai, Eitan Muller, Customer Lifetime Social Value (CLSV), 2021
- Elie Ofek, Barak Libai, Eitan Muller, Customer Management Dynamics and Cohort Analysis, 2020
- Elie Ofek, Barak Libai, Eitan Muller, Ride-Hailing Services: Forecasting Uber's Growth, 2019

=== Selected articles ===
- Appel, Gil, Barak Libai, Eitan Muller, Ron Shachar, On the Monetization of Mobile Apps, International Journal of Research in Marketing, 37, 2020, pp. 93–107
- Libai, Barak, Eitan Muller, Renana Peres, Decomposing the Value of Word of Mouth Seeding Programs: Acceleration Vs. Expansion, Journal of Marketing Research, April 2013, pp. 161–176
- Ostreicher-Singer, Gal, Barak Libai, Liron Sivan, Eyal Carmi and Ohad Yassin, The Network Value of Products, Journal of Marketing, 77(3), 2013 pp. 1–14.
- Nitzan, Irit and Barak Libai, Social Effects on Customer Retention, Journal of Marketing, 75(6), 2011, pp. 24–38
- Libai, Barak, Eitan Muller, and Renana Peres, The Diffusion of Services, Journal of Marketing Research, 46 (1), 2009, pp. 163–175
- Hogan, John E., Katherine N. Lemon, and Barak Libai, What is the True Value of a Lost Customer?, Journal of Service Research, 5 (3), 2003, pp. 196–208
- Barak Libai, Eyal Biyalogorsky, Eitan Gerstner, Setting Referral Fees in Affiliate Marketing., Journal of Service Research – J SERV RES. 5, 2003, pp. 303–315 doi:10.1177/1094670503005004003
- Goldenberg, Jacob, Barak Libai, and Eitan Muller, Talk of the Network: A Complex System Look at the Underlying Process of Word of Mouth, Marketing Letters, 12(3), 2001, pp. 209–221

== Awards and recognitions ==
Libai's work has won research prizes which include awards from the International Journal of Research in Marketing (2021), Journal of Marketing Outstanding Reviewer Award (2019), Journal of Service Research Best Paper Award (2004), Buzzell Award by the Marketing Science Institute (2004), Best Service Article Award – American Marketing Association (2004), International Conference on Information Systems (ICIS) – Best Paper Award (2012), and the ESOMAR Excellence Award (2009).
