= STEPS trial =

The STEPS trial (an acronym for Study of Neurontin: Titrate to Efficacy, Profile of Safety) was a clinical trial sponsored by Parke-Davis (now Pfizer) to evaluate the anticonvulsant Neurontin. It is notable for being a seeding trial to promote that drug and for contributing to the drug companies loss in the court case Franklin v. Parke-Davis.

Detailed documents were released due to litigation against Parke-Davis and reviewed by several researchers in a 2011 Annals of Internal Medicine article. The STEPS trial was presented as a phase IV clinical trial with the stated objective to "study efficacy, safety, tolerability, and quality of life among gabapentin users"; however, the trial was both uncontrolled and unblinded and the scientific validity of the trial was considered dubious by independent external sources. Documents also revealed that the trial recruited 772 physician investigators, many with very limited research experience, provided inadequate training for investigators, and that company sales representatives were "directly involved in collecting and recording individual subject trial data".

The STEPS study has been considered as an example of pharmaceutical marketing merging with research.
