= Shavit Matias =

Israeli law expert

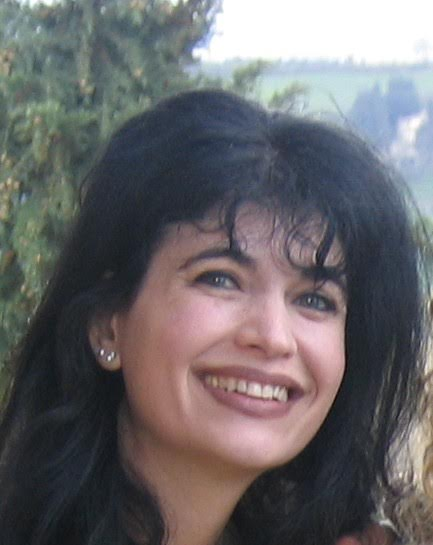

Shavit Matias (Hebrew: שביט מתיאס) is an Israeli international law and globalization expert who was the first Deputy Attorney General of Israel for International Law. She is a Research Fellow at the Hoover Institution Stanford University and a member of Hoover's Task Force on National Security and Law. She also heads the Program on Diplomacy and Conflict Resolution at the Interdisciplinary Center Herzliya (IDC), and is in the Executive Leadership of the Institute for Policy and Strategy (IDC).

== Deputy Attorney General of Israel ==
Matias was nominated by the Israeli government as its first Deputy Attorney General for International Law. She served as Deputy Attorney General between 2004 and 2013, and founded, built and headed the Department for International Agreements and International Litigation within Israel's Ministry of Justice. She oversaw the work of many government attorneys, was a member of the Israeli National Security Council's strategic teams, and was closely involved in advising prime ministers, the government and the cabinet on international law and policy, including aspects of national security, combating money laundering and terrorism, the middle east conflict, international litigation, international trade and other matters.

In her role as Deputy Attorney General, Matias also participated in rounds of permanent status negotiations with the Palestinians, and was a member of Israeli Palestinian joint committees. She headed and participated in inter-ministerial task forces and represented the State of Israel in United Nations committees and international judicial and other forums. She also served as a commissioner at the United Nations Commission on International Trade Law, and represented the Israeli government in numerous diverse bilateral and multilateral negotiations, including with teams of trade negotiations with the EU and accession to the OECD.

== Private Practice ==
Prior to joining the public service, Matias practiced law in the International Trade and Litigation Department of the law firm of Shearman at Sterling (Washington DC), and was a partner in the law firm of Yigal Arnon & Co. (Israel).

== Hoover Institution Stanford University ==
Since 2013, Matias is a research fellow at the Hoover Institution, Stanford University, specializing in globalization, national security, international disputes, global governance and international law, and is a member of its national security task force.

== Academia ==
Since 1992 Matias has been teaching as an adjunct professor academic courses on Globalization, International Law, International Dispute Settlement Mechanisms, the Middle East Conflict, and International Negotiations, at different academic institutions including Georgetown University Law Center, the Hebrew University, Tel Aviv University and Stanford University.

Since 2015 she is heading the Diplomacy and Conflict Resolution program at the Lauder School of Government Diplomacy and Strategy, IDC, specializing in Globalization. She is also Director of Programs and Member of the Executive Leadership of the Institute for Policy and Strategy (IPS).

She is a recipient of the 2008 alumnae Award from Georgetown University Law Center for outstanding achievements in the profession. She is a member of the Israeli Bar and the New York Bar. She received her LL.B. from Tel Aviv University, her LL.M. from Georgetown University and her Doctorate in International Law (S.J.D.) under the guidance of Professor Judge Thomas Buergenthal from George Washington University.
