= Anat Brunstein Klomek =

Israeli psychologist

Anat Brunstein-Klomek
- ענת ברונשטיין קלומק
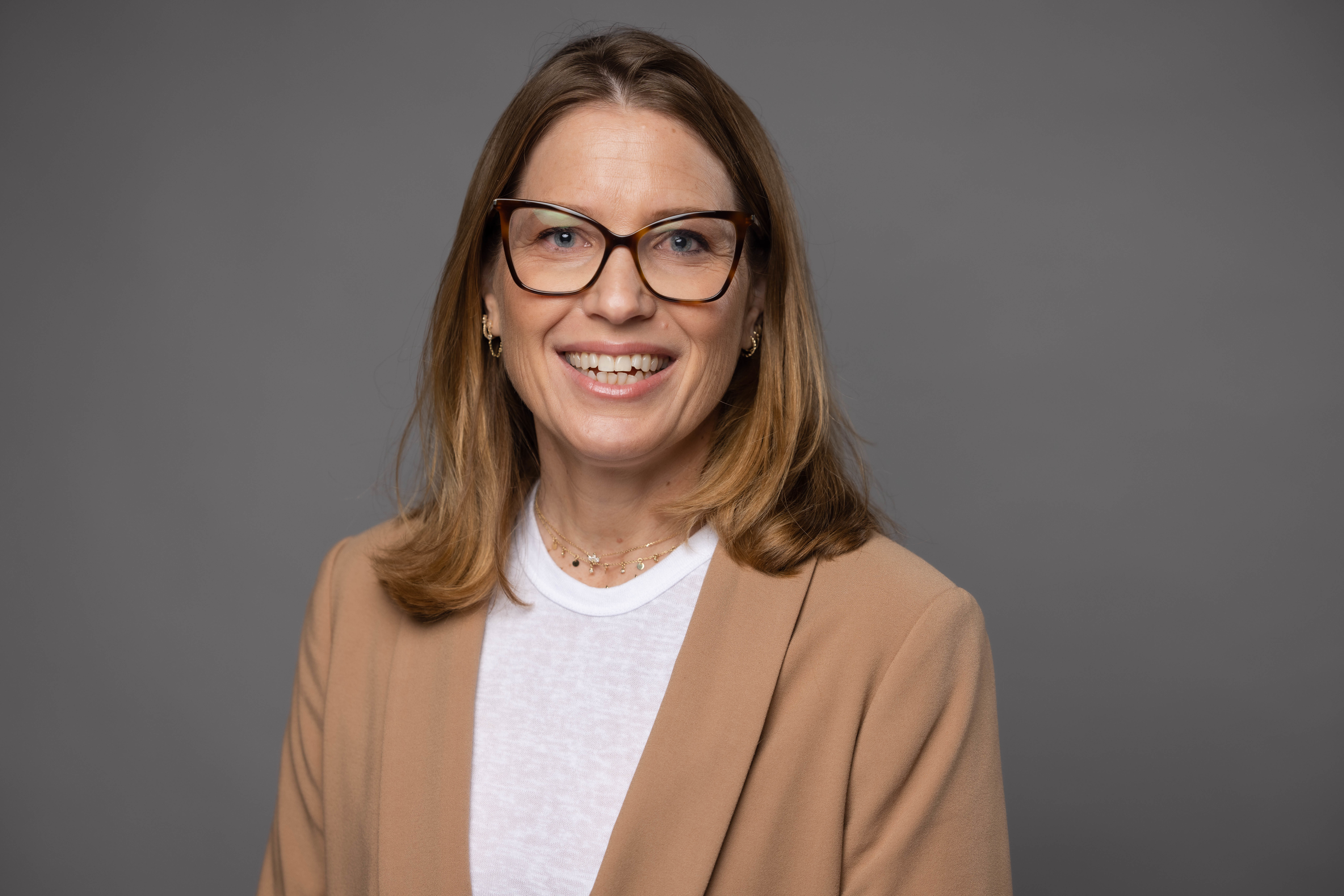
- Education: Bar Ilan University; Ben-Gurion University of the Negev
- Scientific career
- Workplaces: New York State Psychiatric Institute; Interdisciplinary Center Herzliya
- Thesis: Self and Object Representations of Suicidal Adolescents (2004)

Anat Brunstein-Klomek (Hebrew: ענת ברונשטיין קלומק) is an Israeli psychologist. She is an associate professor at the Interdisciplinary Center Herzliya and holds an adjunct position at the New York State Psychiatric Institute. Her research focuses on depression, suicide and bullying.

== Early life and education ==
Brunstein-Klomek studied behavioural sciences at the Ben-Gurion University of the Negev. She moved to Bar-Ilan University for her graduate studies, where she completed both a master's degree and doctorate in clinical psychology. Her doctoral research was supervised by Israel Orbach and considered the self-representation of suicidal adolescents. Brunstein-Klomek was a research fellow in the laboratory of Madelyn Gould in the Division of Child and Adolescent Psychiatry at Columbia University and the New York State Psychiatric Institute. There she was trained by Laura Mufson in interpersonal psychotherapy for adolescents. She worked with the medical psychologist Barbara Stanley on psychosocial treatments for adolescent Americans with depression.

== Research and career ==
After completing her postdoctoral training, Brunstein-Klomek returned to Israel, where she joined the Interdisciplinary Center Herzliya. She has shown that frequent exposure to bullying can increase a young person's risk of suicidal ideation and depression. She has described cyberbullying as a major public health problem, and proposed that school students should be taught both resilience and how to conduct themselves. She has argued that all members of society can play a role in bullying prevention, and that adults and parents in particular can be transformative for victimised children. Brunstein-Klomek has used interpersonal psychotherapy to support adolescents with attention deficit hyperactivity disorder and specific learning differences.

Since 2015 Brunstein-Klomek has been involved with the Israel National Suicide Prevention plan, through which she has worked on programmes for Palestinian and Israeli people. The programme has helped teachers, parents and counsellors have conversations with school students. Brunstein-Klomek has investigated the impact of internet use in people diagnosed with eating disorders. As part of this work, Brunstein-Klomek showed that despite people with eating disorders accessing pro-ana websites, it is possible to redirect them to useful websites which can help. During the COVID-19 pandemic, Brunstein-Klomek became concerned about the provision of mental health services to at-risk groups. Writing in The Lancet, Brunstein-Klomek called for suicide prevention to be integrated into the global response to the pandemic. She argued that during and after the extended periods of mandatory social isolation at-risk populations may be at a greater risk of suicidal ideology.

=== Academic service ===
Brunstrin Klomek is assistant editor of the Archives of Suicide Research, as well as on the editorial boards of the Journal of Youth and Adolescence and Lancet Psychiatry.

== Selected publications ==
- Brunstein Klomek, Anat; Marrocco, Frank; Kleinman, Marjorie; Schonfeld, Irvin S; Gould, Madelyn S (January 2007). "Bullying, depression, and suicidality in adolescents". Journal of the American Academy of Child and Adolescent Psychiatry. 46 (1): 40–49. doi:10.1097/01.chi.0000242237.84925.18. PMID 17195728.
- Sourander, Andre; Brunstein Klomek, Anat; Ikonen, Maria; Lindroos, Jarna; Luntamo, Terhi; Koskelainen, Merja; Ristkari, Terja; Helenius, Hans (1 July 2010). "Psychosocial Risk Factors Associated With Cyberbullying Among Adolescents". Archives of General Psychiatry. 67 (7): 720–8. doi:10.1001/archgenpsychiatry.2010.79. PMID 20603453.
- Klomek, Anat Brunstein; Sourander, Andre; Gould, Madelyn (May 2010). "The Association of Suicide and Bullying in Childhood to Young Adulthood: A Review of Cross-Sectional and Longitudinal Research Findings". The Canadian Journal of Psychiatry. 55 (5): 282–288. doi:10.1177/070674371005500503. PMID 20482954. S2CID 23962627.
