= Yossi Maaravi =

Israeli innovation researcher, lecturer and author

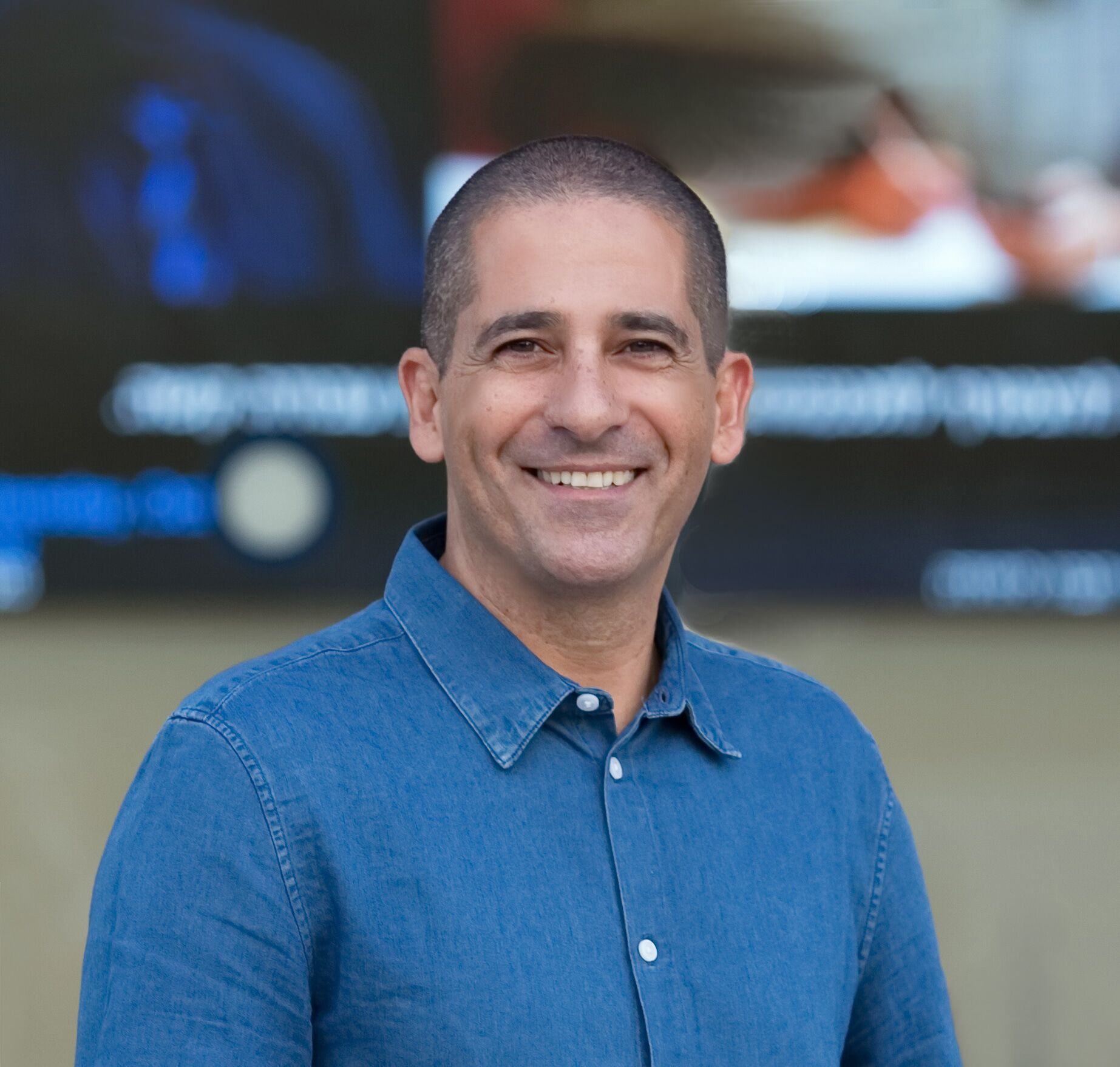
Yossi Maaravi, 2018

Yossi Maaravi (Hebrew: יוסי מערבי; born 1973) is a decision making and negotiation researcher. He is the dean of the Adelson School of Entrepreneurship at Reichman University, a lecturer, and an author.

== Biography ==
Maaravi was born and raised in Holon. After graduating from high school, he served in the military in a unit that aims to assist high school students & soldiers alike in improving their Arabic. After his military service, he completed a double-major B.A. (psychology and the "Amirim" interdisciplinary honors program) from the Hebrew University of Jerusalem. During his studies, he traveled numerous times to the Far East and worked as a tour guide in China, Nepal, and Tibet.

Maaravi received his Ph.D. in business administration from the Tel Aviv University. His doctorate deals with the psychological aspects of business negotiation. Among others, Maaravi lectured at Tel Aviv University. Now, Maaravi is the co-founder and Dean of the Adelson School of Entrepreneurship in the Reichman University in Herzliya. He also currently teaches as a visiting professor at the Darmstadt University of Technology and the Frankfurt School of Management and Economics. In addition, Dr. Ma'ari has rich experience in entrepreneurship, as well as consulting for companies and organizations. He is married and has three children.

== Writing ==
Maaravi's first book "The Juice Tree", is a children's book illustrated by the illustrator Shahar Kober and published in 2010 by "Hakibbutz Hameuchad - Sifriat Poalim Publishing Group". The book depicts a "social dilemma" and teaches important insights on correct community conduct. "The Juice Tree" has received warm critique in Israel and was included in the Israeli education ministry's recommended books for 2010-2011. Following the success in Israel, the book was translated to Korean in 2011.

His second book "Friendship and Magic", which was also illustrated by Shahar Kober, was published in 2011 by the same publishing house. The book describes a tale in which a creative solution is needed in order to solve a conflict and demonstrates the meaning of an integrative negotiation.

These two books are part of a continuing project that aims to expose children and their parents through simple children's books to basic insights in social science thus helping them be better members in their community.

A short story written by Maaravi called "Every Great Forest Begins with One Small Tree" was published in the children's Anthology "Klompopo Island and more stories", 2010 by "Hakibbutz Hameuchad - Sifriat Poalim Publishing Group".

During 2015 Maaravi's book "You Deserve Better – how to succeed in the negotiation of your life" was published by "Kinneret Zmora-Bitan Dvir" publishing group. This book takes a wide view on negotiation in different aspects of life, and suggests a practical toolbox to improve in these fields, based on research from the fields of social and behavioral studies.

Moreover, Dr. Maaravi continues to publish opinion pieces in the daily Israeli press.

== Research ==
Dr. Maaravi engaged in research in the areas of decision-making, negotiation, creativity, and innovation. Specifically, Dr. Maaravi focuses on the feasibility of offering second in a negotiation, the effect of different traits on the negotiation process, the impact of the first offer on various factors in bargaining, and on innovative methodologies for studying entrepreneurship and research. His papers were published, among others, in Public Health, Journal of Personality and Social Psychology, Review of Managerial Science, Personality and Individual Differences, and Judgment and Decision Making.

== Published works ==
=== Books ===
- Yossi Maaravi, The Juice Tree, Hakibbutz Hameuchad - Sifriat Poalim Publishing Group, 2010
- Yossi Maaravi, Friendship and Magic, Hakibbutz Hameuchad - Sifriat Poalim Publishing Group, 2011
- Yossi Maaravi, You Deserve Better – how to succeed in the negotiation of your life, Kinneret Zmora-Bitan Dvir" publishing group, 2015

=== Academic Articles ===
- Maaravi, Y., Levy, A., & Heller, B. (2023). To Bid or Not to Bid? That is the Question! First‐Versus Second‐Mover Advantage in Negotiations. Negotiation Journal, 39(3), 259-278.
- Maaravi, Y., Hameiri, B., Gur, T., Heller, B., Confino, D., Amdor, H., & Levi, Y. (2023). Using Leading Questions to Reduce Resistance to Innovation. Journal of Creativity, 33(3), 100067.
- Maaravi, Y., Levy, A., Gur, T., Confino, D., & Segal, S. (2021). “The tragedy of the commons”: How individualism and collectivism affected the spread of the COVID-19 pandemic. Frontiers in Public Health, 9, 37.
- Maaravi, Y., Pazy, A., & Ganzach, Y. (2014). Winning a battle but losing the war: On the drawbacks of using the anchoring tactic in distributive negotiations. Judgment and Decision Making, 9(6), 548-557.
- Maaravi Y., Ganzach Y., Pazy A., (2011) Negotiation as a form of persuasion: Arguments in first offers. Journal of Personality and Social Psychology. 101 (2), pp. 245-255.

=== Opinion Pieces ===
- Op-Ed about the origins of creativity and challenges facing Israel's education system, The Marker
- Op-Ed dealing with the need for a new perspective on the social protests in Israel, Ynet news
- Op-Ed about the connection between the Jewish orthodox sector and Israel's social protests, The Marker
- Op-Ed dealing with the importance of individual responsibility in a democratic regime
