= Shai Hermesh =

Israeli politician

- שי חרמש
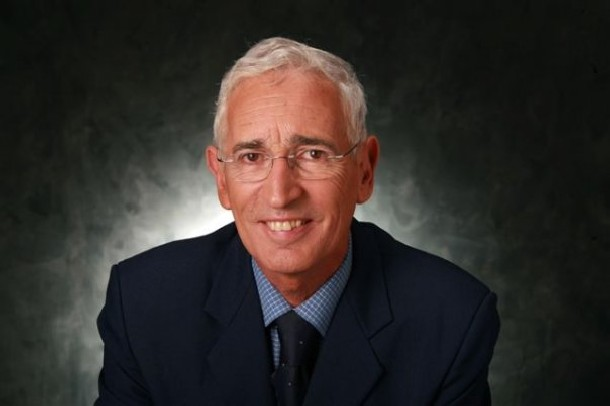

Faction represented in the Knesset
- 2006–2013: Kadima

Personal details
- Born: 23 March 1944 (age 81) Tel Aviv, Mandatory Palestine

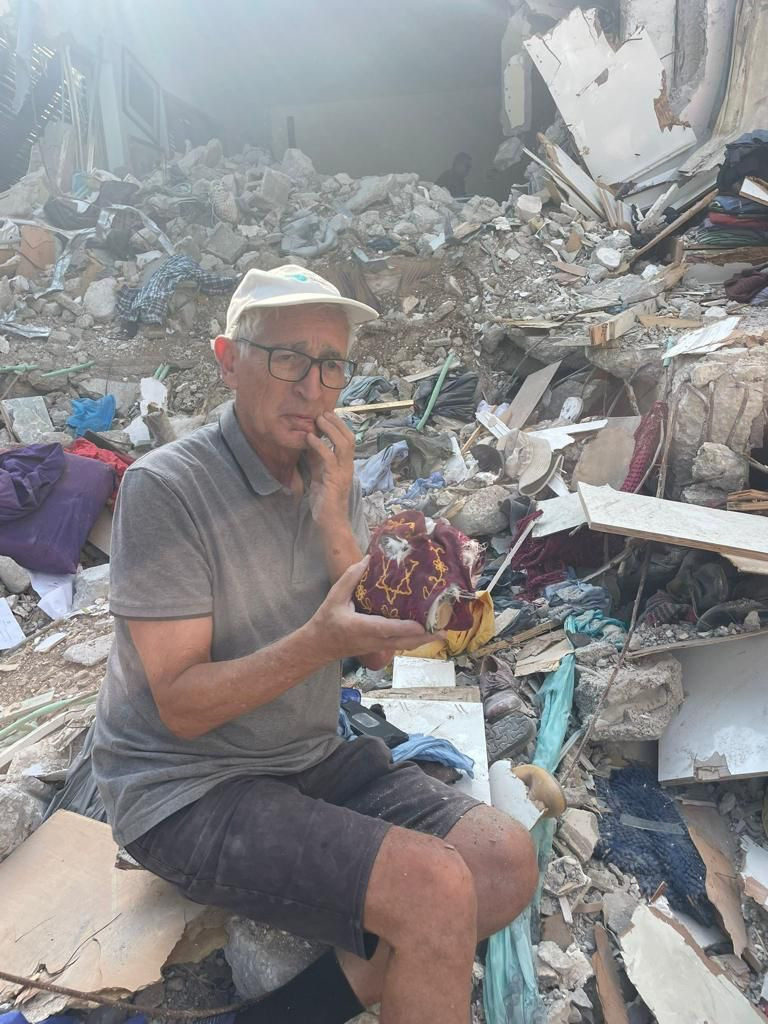
Hermesh in the ruins of his house in Kfar Aza after the Hamas massacre, with his tefillin that he found among the ruins.

Shai Hermesh (Hebrew: שי חרמש; born 23 March 1944) is an Israeli politician who served as a member of the Knesset for Kadima between 2006 and 2013. As chairman of the Israeli branch of the World Jewish Congress (WJC), Hermesh is also a member of the WJC Executive Committee.

== Biography ==
Born in Tel Aviv in 1944, he attended Tichon Hadash high school in Tel Aviv. Hermesh spent his military service in the Nahal and the paratroop brigade. With the conclusion of his military service in 1965, he became a member of kibbutz Kfar Aza, situated on the Gaza Strip border. A year later, in the Six-Day War, Hermesh served as a combat soldier in the paratroop brigade, under the command of colonel Motta Gur in the battle to capture Jerusalem.

From 1967 to 1972 Hermesh studied economics and sociology at the Hebrew University of Jerusalem, gaining a BA, and later acquired an MBA from the same university. During his studies, he was community manager in his kibbutz as well as a member of the United Kibbutz Movement secretariat.

In the Yom Kippur War in 1973, Hermesh was a combat soldier in the paratroop force that crossed the Suez Canal under the command of General Ariel Sharon. After the conflict, Hermesh served as the economics manager of Kfar Aza for three years, followed by another five years as the finance director of Kafrit, a company producing raw material for the plastics industry. At the end of his term of office, he embarked on studies towards a doctorate in the history of the Jewish People in the modern era.

In 1987, after two years during which he was responsible for growing and marketing agricultural produce for export from the Negev farms, Hermesh was elected mayor of the Sha'ar HaNegev Regional Council, a position which he retained until 2003. During his time as mayor the council won the Gold Prize for excellence in financial management for six consecutive years, which led to him being given the Knight of Quality Government Award. Hermesh also held the position of Chairman of the Executive Committee of Sapir Academic College in Sderot. At the same time, he served as a member of the forum of the Broadcasting National Authority and on the National Parks authority, as well as helping to establish Ibim, a new village in the Negev for students during the post–1990 mass immigration from the Former Soviet Union.

Before the 2006 elections Hermesh left the Labor Party in which he had been active for forty years and joined the new Kadima party. Even before, as a treasurer of the Jewish Agency, he collaborated with Sharon and played a crucial part in defeating the candidacy of Natan Sharansky to the post of the Chairman of the Jewish Agency, which went to Sharon's ally Zeev Bielsky instead. He won 30th place on the party's Knesset list, but narrowly missed out on winning a seat as the party picked up only 29 mandates. However, Kadima MK Uriel Reichman resigned almost immediately after the election after he was not given the Education ministry portfolio he had been promised before the elections (it went to Labor's Yuli Tamir instead). As the next placed candidate on the party's list, Hermesh replaced him in the Knesset.

Placed twenty-fourth on the Kadima list, Hermesh retained his seat in the 2009 elections.

In the 18th Knesset he initiated a law that would help consumers pay less in financial agreements that were tied to a specific price index, when that index goes down. Placed sixth on the Kadima list for the 2013 elections, he lost his seat as the party was reduced to two MKs.

Hermesh had five children with his partner Hava. One of his sons, Omer, was killed in the Kfar Aza massacre in October 2023.
