= Yair Galily =

Israeli sociologist

Yair Galily (Hebrew: יאיר גלילי; born July 10, 1970) is a behavioral scientist, head of the Sport, Media and Society (SMS) Research Lab at the Sammy Ofer School of Communications and a senior researcher at the International Institute for Counter-Terrorism (ICT) at Reichman University (IDC). Galily is a Full Professor and a Chartered Member (CPsychol.) of the British Psychological Society and is the Chief Behavioral Officer for the Israel Olympic Football team, which has successfully qualified for the Paris 2024 Summer Olympic Games.

Thus far (2024), has written and edited 10 books and more than 200 peer-reviewed articles in international academic journals in various fields related to behavioral and social aspects of sports and exercise. His research on the "Choking under pressure" phenomenon of NBA players (2018) gained worldwide resonance, including in the New Yorker and the World Economic Forum. His research on the media power and social activism of basketball player LeBron James, alongside "Artificial Intelligence and sports Journalism" (2019), is gaining similar reverberation. He is the founder and head of the research unit at the Israeli Football Association and member of the Union of European Football Associations’ (UEFA) club licensing committee. Lieutenant Colonel (Res.) Galily is chief (Organizational and Instructional) Behavioural Scientist of the Israel Defense Forces Combat Fitness Centre.

== Biography ==
Born and raised in Petah Tikva, Israel, is the great-grandson of Rabbi Kopel Visoker, head of the first managing committee of Petah Tikva (1898). He was educated at the Ein Ganim and Brenner schools and later served in the IDF as an officer in a variety of field and administrative units. Galily Graduated (M.Sc.) from Clark University (Worcester, MA, USA) in 1996 and wrote his doctorate dissertation (Ph.D.), under the supervision of Ken Sheard and Eric Dunning, at the Centre for Research into Sport and Society in Leicester University (UK, 2000). Prior to joining Reichman University (IDC), Galily was a faculty member and Dean of the Academic College at the Wingate Institute, Israel.

== Major Work ==
Galily is considered, along with Amir Ben-Porat, to a pioneer in the field of sport sociology in Israel. His text-book (with Ben-Porat and Ronnie Lidor) Introduction to Sport and Society (Open University Press, 2010) and Sport, Politics and Society in the Land of Israel (Routledage, 2007) considered the first-ever comprehensive texts on sport sociology from an Israeli perspective.

In recent years Galily have guest-edited few leading international journals, among them American Behavioural Scientist (Sage, 2016, 2022; 2024), Television & New Media, (Sage, 2015) and Online Information Review (Emerald, 2016). In 2018, Galily published, along with his post-doctoral student Elia Morgulev, Frontiers in Psychology,'s paper entitled "Choking or Delivering Under Pressure? The Case of Elimination Games in NBA Playoffs" which was largely discussed at both the New Yorker and t he World Economic Forum.

In April 2021 his book "The Psychology of Sport, Performance And Ethics" was published in Lausanne by Frontiers Media SA. [doi: 10.3389/978-2-88966-679-9]. In January 2023 his edited collection "The Munich Massacre Contemporary Thoughts and Views on Sport and Terrorism from a Global Perspective" was published by Taylor and Francis.

== Career ==
Galily was the professional committee chairman and a member of the Israel's Academic Sport Association (ASA) board of directors from 2002–2003 and 2005–2008. He also served as a professional committee member at 'Special Olympics Israel,' which is part of the Special Olympics International nonprofit organization dedicated to empowering individuals with intellectual disabilities to become physically fit, productive, and respected members of society through year-round sports training and competitions.

Prof. Galily is frequently sought after by both Israeli and international media for his expert insights into the social dynamics and processes related to sporting activities. His interviews cover a broad spectrum of topics, including the cultural significance of sports, the impact of technological advancements on the sports industry, the intersection of sports and national identity, and the role of sports in promoting social cohesion and global diplomacy.
