= Consumer & Prescriber Grant Program =

The Consumer & Prescriber Grant Program (also going by other names, including Attorney General Prescriber Grant Program) was a grant program established with fines paid by Pfizer in the Franklin v. Parke-Davis trial for False Claims Act violations relating to off-label use of gabapentin.

== Grant recipients ==
There were 24 original grant recipients.

- Oregon State University
- "Education about Heavily Marketed Drugs"
- PharmedOut
- Federation of State Medical Boards
- Robert Larner College of Medicine
- The Pew Charitable Trusts
- American Medical Association
