= Ashager Araro =

Ethiopian-Israeli activist

- אשגר ערו
- Born: 1991 (age 34–35); Gondar, Ethiopia
- Citizenship: Israel
- Education: IDC Herzliya
- Occupation: Activist

Ashager Araro (Hebrew: אשגר ערו; born 1991) is an Ethiopian-Israeli activist.

== Early life and education ==
Araro was born while her parents were traveling from their home in Gondar via the Ethiopian capital Addis Ababa to Israel as part of Operation Solomon. She was raised in Yavne. During the Second Intifada, Araro's parents often refused to let her leave the house due to fear for her safety.

While growing up in Israel, Araro experienced racism as an Ethiopian Jew. For example, she was placed in a remedial English class that only had other Ethiopian students; she later recounted: "the only characteristic that determined if you ended up in the remedial class was your ethnicity".

Araro studied government, diplomacy, and strategy at the IDC Herzliya.

== Career ==
Araro served in the Israeli Defense Forces (IDF) as a Lieutenant in the Paratroopers Reconnaissance Unit. She has said that she learned to speak up for herself while serving in a unit dominated by men. As part of her service, she was also an ambassador for Stand With Us.

She has since worked as a captain in the reserves of the IDF.

== Activism ==
Araro identifies as both a feminist and a Zionist. She has spoken in favor of a two-state solution and warned against the demonization of Palestinians or Israelis.

In 2021, Araro released a video as part of the "My Zionism" campaign in which she critiqued the idea of Zionism as "white imperialism" and spoke about the history of Ethiopian Jews in Israel. United with Israel praised the video as bringing attention to ethnic minorities in Israel, while Al Jazeera criticized the video as a PR stunt meant to deflect attention away from human rights abuses perpetuated by the Israeli government.

Araro has also spoken out about racism and police brutality against Ethiopian Jews in Israeli society. She has stated: "I live in a majority Jewish country, but my Jewish identity doesn't shield me from racism. [...] The fight against racism and anti-Semitism is ongoing; we need to fight both battles."

In early 2020, Araro opened Battae, a cultural center in Tel Aviv dedicated to Ethiopian-Israeli culture. Later that year, Araro was named one of the top 40 global advocates for Israel online by Jewish News Syndicate. In 2022, she was one of Future of Jewish's 39 People Making Waves Across the Jewish World. The Jewish Press has called her "Israel's Secret Weapon Against Woke Antisemitism". The Jerusalem Post named her one of 25 “Young ViZionaries” in 2024.

== Personal life ==
As of 2021, Araro lived in Tel Aviv with her sister.
