= Shlomo Breznitz =

Israeli author, psychologist and politician (1936–2026)

- שלמה ברזניץ
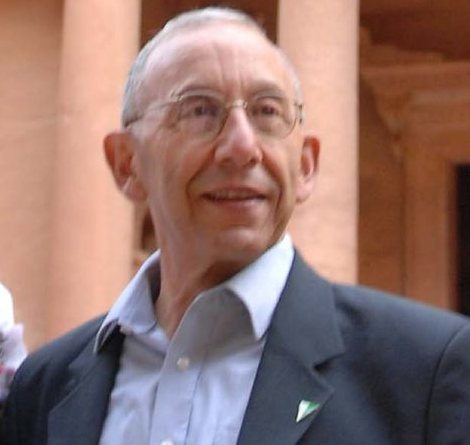

Faction represented in the Knesset
- 2006–2007: Kadima

Personal details
- Born: 3 August 1936 Bratislava, Czechoslovakia
- Died: April 2026 (aged 89)

Shlomo Breznitz (Hebrew: שלמה ברזניץ; 3 August 1936 – April 2026) was an Israeli author, psychologist, professor of psychology, rector and president of the University of Haifa, and previous member of the Knesset. He was the founder and former member of the board of directors of CogniFit, a brain fitness software company.

== Early life ==
Breznitz was born in Bratislava in Czechoslovakia (today Slovakia). During the Holocaust he and his sister were hidden in a Roman Catholic orphanage, an experience detailed in his memoirs, "Memory Fields". His father Josef born in Torok Balint was killed in Auschwitz, but his mother Janka Klein born in Trencsen survived and they made aliyah to Israel in 1949. He studied psychology at the Hebrew University of Jerusalem, gaining a BA in 1960, an MA in 1962 and a PhD in 1965, the first person to receive a doctorate in the new field of psychology in Israel.

== Later career ==
From 1969 until 1971, Breznitz served as a consultant to the Israeli Air Force on problems of stress. He was the founding director of the Ray D. Wolfe Center for Study of Psychological Stress at the University of Haifa in 1979. Breznitz also has served as the Lady Davis Professor of Psychology and was the visiting professor at the London School of Economics, Berkeley, Stanford, National Institutes of Health and Rockefeller University. He has also been a visiting scientist at the National Institute of Mental Health in Washington D.C.

Breznitz wrote eleven books and has contributed chapters to over twenty other books in addition to numerous professional articles and research reports. In 1999 he retired from Haifa University to found brain fitness software company, CogniFit. Berznitz has developed patented technology that turns the personal computer into a tool for providing individualized training programs for a wide range of cognitive skills needed for everyday function and cognitive skills specific to particular fields of interest.

== Politics ==
After Ehud Olmert, a personal friend, convinced him to enter politics, Breznitz was elected to the Knesset on the Kadima list in 2006, the first Slovak to become an MK. He was the founder of the India-Israel Parliamentary Friendship Group in the Knesset. However, he retired from politics and left the Knesset on 28 September 2007 to resume his work in CogniFit.

== Death ==
Breznitz died in April 2026, at the age of 89.

== Bibliography ==
Books authored by Breznitz include:

- Social Psychology Am-Oved, 1969 (Hebrew)
- Stress in Israel Van Nostrand Reinhold Co., 1981
- Handbook of Stress with L. Goldberger (Eds.). New York: Free Press of Macmillan, 1982
- Denial of Stress International Universities Press, 1983
- Cry Wolf: The Psychology of False Alarms Englewood Hills, N. J.: Lawrence Erlbaum Associates, 1984
- Molecular Biology of Stress with O. Zinder (Eds.). New York: Alan R. Liss, Inc., 1988
- Memory Fields New York, N.Y.: Alfred A. Knopf, 1992
- Handbook of stress (2nd Revised Edition) with Leo Goldberger (Eds.) Free press, January 1993
- Maximum Brainpower: Challenging The Brain for Health and Wisdom with Collins Hemingway. Ballantine Books, 2012
- The Tapestry of Life. Hakibutz Hameuchad, 2012
- Sinamatella: A Quest for Meaning. Dekel publishing house & Samuel Wachtman's Sons, 2014.
