= International Institute for Counter-Terrorism =

Israeli think tank

The International Institute for Counter-Terrorism (ICT) is an Israeli think tank founded in 1996 and located at Reichman University, in Herzliya, Israel.

== Activities ==
According to The Village Voice, the ICT is a think tank developing public-policy solutions to international terrorism, housed at the prestigious Interdisciplinary Center in Herzliya (now called Reichman University).

According toForeign Affairs, ICT presents an Israeli perspective known for its searchable database on terrorist attacks by organizations both within and outside the Middle East.

In the University of Pennsylvania's 2014 Global Go To Think Tanks Report, ICT was ranked as the 29th best think tank in the Middle East and North Africa.

The ICT's reporting has been mentioned by USA Today, and Asian Tribune.

== Leadership ==
One of ICT's founders and board members, Boaz Ganor, served as the ICT's executive director from 1996 through 2004, when he was temporarily replaced by Lior Lotan. Ganor returned as executive director in late 2006. Eitan Azani serves as deputy director.

== Funding ==
The ICT professes to rely exclusively on private donations and revenue from events, projects and programs.
