= Uriel Reichman =

Israeli politician

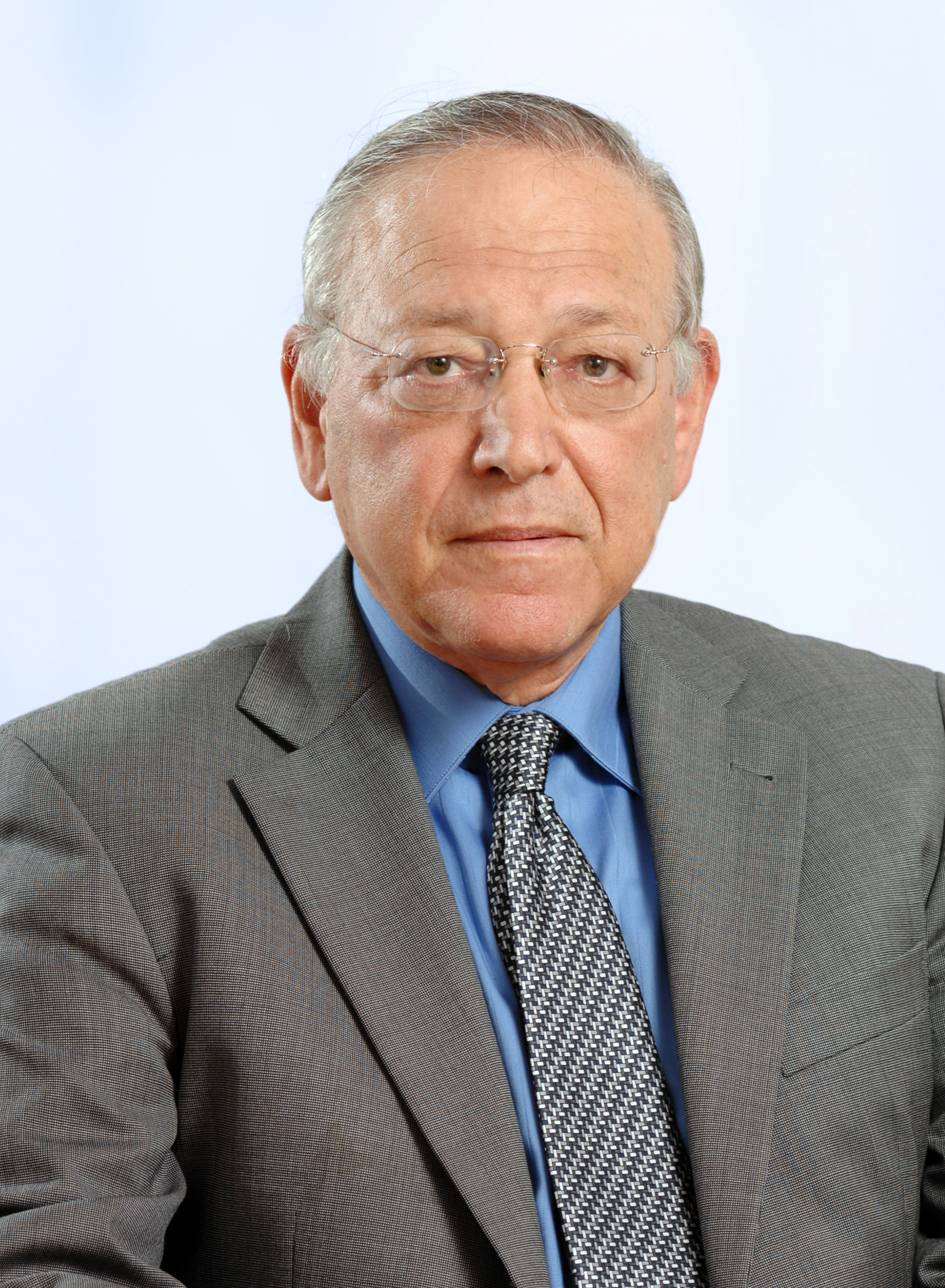

Academic positions
- 1994–2005: President of the IDC Herzliya
- 2007–2021: President of the IDC Herzliya

Faction represented in the Knesset
- 2006: Kadima

Personal details
- Born: 4 July 1942 (age 83) Tel Aviv, Mandatory Palestine
- Education: Hebrew University of Jerusalem (LLB, LLM); University of Chicago (JSD)

Military service
- Branch/service: Israel Defence Forces
- Rank: Major
- Unit: Paratroopers Brigade
- Battles/wars: Six-Day War; War of Attrition; Yom Kippur War

Uriel Reichman (Hebrew: אוריאל רייכמן; born 4 July 1942) is an Israeli legal scholar and former politician. In 1994 he established the Interdisciplinary Center Herzliya, later renamed Reichman University. He remained its president for 27 years and is currently chair of its board of directors. He also briefly served as a member of the Knesset in 2006 for Kadima.

== Biography ==
Uriel Reichman was born in Tel Aviv during the Mandate era to Gerda and Alfred who had fled Nazi Germany. After attending elementary school in Ramat Gan and Tichon Hadash high school in Tel Aviv, during which he was a member of the Scouts and Maccabi Ramat Gan football club, he started his national service in the Israel Defence Forces, serving in the Paratroopers Brigade and reaching the rank of lieutenant. He then studied law at the Hebrew University of Jerusalem where he was taught by Aharon Barak, earning an LLB in 1967 and an LLM in 1972. He was called up for reserve duty during the Six-Day War in 1967, the War of Attrition (1967–1970) and the Yom Kippur War in 1973, during which his brother Gad was killed. After his brother's death, Reichman was transferred to a non-combat unit, becoming president of a military tribunal and attaining the rank of major. In 1975 he earned a JSD from the University of Chicago.

== Legal and academic career ==
In the mid-1980s Reichman initiated and headed a team that formulated a proposed Constitution of Israel. The proposal included, among other things, the idea of direct election to the premiership. Between 1985 and 1990 he worked as a lecturer, senior lecture and dean of the Faculty of Law at Tel Aviv University, before becoming dean of Ramot Mishpat. In 1990 he established the Ramot Mishpat Law School. In 1994 he established the Interdisciplinary Center in Herzliya, and has served as the organisation's president since its founding (with the exception of the period in 2006 when he was a Member of the Knesset). Reichman retired from the presidency in 2021.

Reichman has served on the board of directors of the First International Bank and Bank Hapoalim. He also has chaired the Israel Bar Association's Committee for Human Rights, headed and served as a member of several public committees, and proposed reforms in the real-estate laws and in the professions of real-estate surveying and brokerage.

== Political career ==
A founder of Shinui, Reichman was elected to head the party's presidium in 2004. However, in November 2005 he left the party to join Ariel Sharon's new Kadima party. For the 2006 elections he was placed eleventh on Kadima's list, and became a Knesset member when the party won 29 seats. However, he resigned his seat on 28 April 2006 in protest at not being given the Education portfolio (which went to Yuli Tamir of the Labor Party), which he claimed he had been promised by both Ariel Sharon and Ehud Olmert. He was replaced by Shai Hermesh.

== Awards and recognitions ==
In 2000 Reichman was made a "Knight of Quality Government" by the Movement for Quality Government. He was awarded an honorary doctorate by Heinrich Heine University in 2010. In 2015 he received the annual Israel Bar Association prize. In 2018 Reichman was given the Robert and JoAnn Bendetson Public Diplomacy Award by the Institute for Global Leadership at Tufts University.
