= Boaz Ganor =

Israeli political scientist

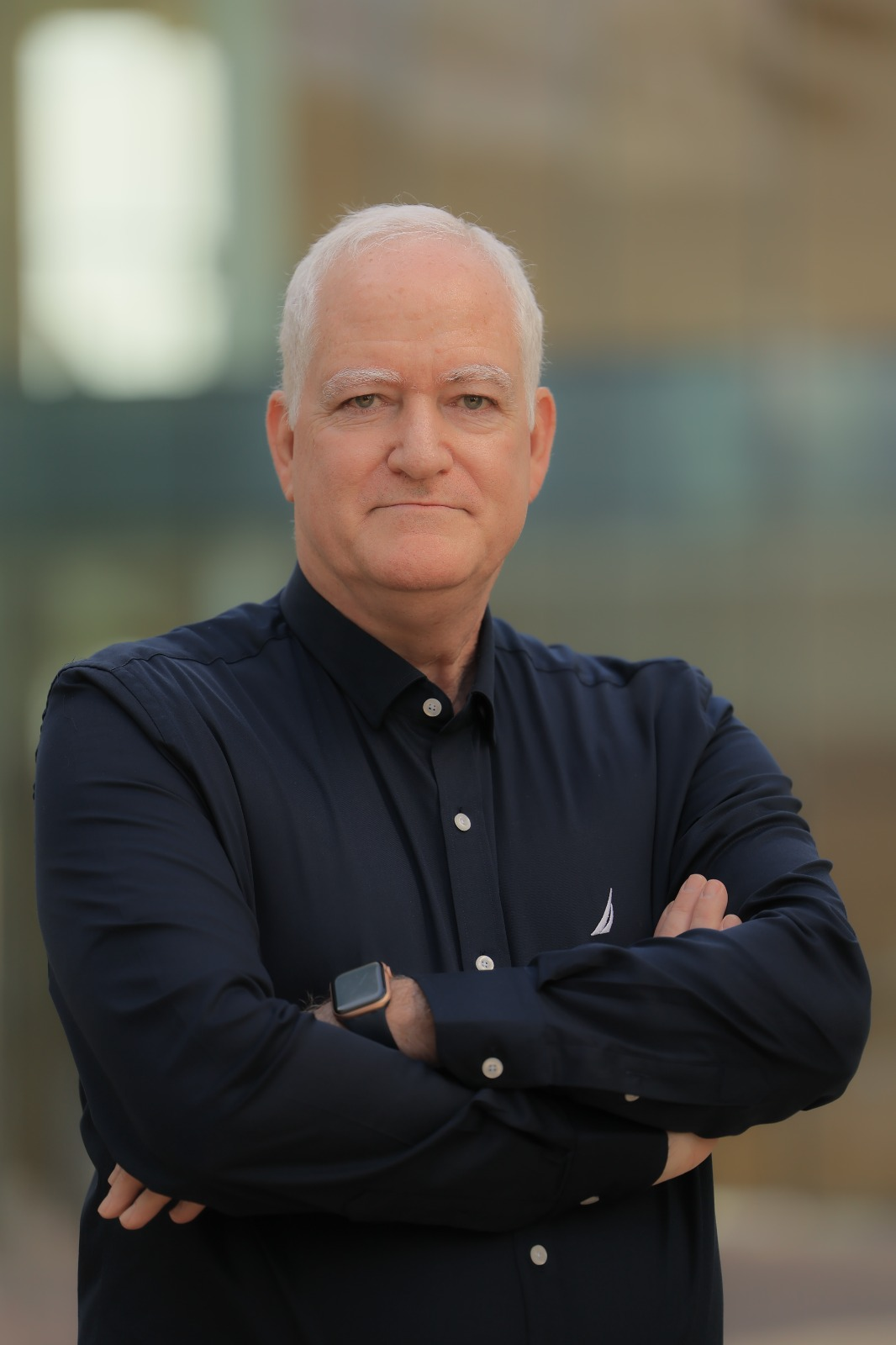

Boaz Ganor (Hebrew: בועז גנור) is the former dean of the Lauder School of Government and Diplomacy at the Interdisciplinary Center and the current President of Reichman University.

== Biography ==
Boaz Ganor is the founder and the executive director of the International Policy Institute for Counter-Terrorism, and is a member of Israel’s National Committee for Homeland Security Technologies, of the International Advisory Board of Institute of Defense and Strategic Studies (IDSS) in Singapore, and of the International Advisory team of the Manhattan Institute (CTCT) to the New-York Police Department (NYPD).

Ganor chairs the ICT's World Summit on Counter-Terrorism, which is the leading international conference on Counter-Terrorism in the world. Ganor lectures on terrorism and counter-terrorism at the High Command Academic Courses of the Israel Defense Forces, as well as at the Lauder School of Government and Diplomacy, and other academic and international forums. He obtained his B.A. in Political Sciences from Hebrew University and his M.A. in Political Studies from Tel Aviv University (thesis: “Terrorism and Public Opinion in Israel”). His Ph.D. thesis for the Hebrew University was on Israel's counter-terrorism strategy.

Ganor served as a consultant to the Israeli government on counter-terrorism. From 1989 to 2003, he was a member of the trilateral Palestinian-Israeli-American Committee on incitement, established under the Wye Accords. He is the author of numerous articles on counter-terrorism published in Israel and abroad. He served as a Distinguished Visiting Fellow at the Hoover Institution at Stanford University during the 2008–2009 academic year.

== Published works ==
- Ganor, Boaz The Counter-Terrorism Puzzle: A Guide for Decision Makers (ISBN 141280602X / 1-4128-0602-X) Transaction Publishers, 2007.
- Boaz Ganor Hypermedia Seduction for Terrorist Recruiting (NATO Science for Peace and Security Series: Human and Societal Dynamics) (ISBN 1586037617 / 1-58603-761-7), Ios Pr Inc, 2007
