= Quantitative Marketing and Economics =

- Discipline: Economics, Marketing
- Language: English
- Edited by: Thomas Otter

Publication details
- History: 2003–present
- Publisher: Springer Science+Business Media
- Frequency: Quarterly
- Impact factor: 1.000 (2017)

Standard abbreviations
- ISO 4: Quant. Mark. Econ.

Indexing
- ISSN: 1570-7156 (print); 1573-711X (web)
- LCCN: 2003261196
- OCLC no.: 628970281

Links
- Journal homepage; Online archive

Quantitative Marketing and Economics is a quarterly peer-reviewed scientific journal publishing original research on the intersection of marketing and economics.

== History ==
The journal was established in 2003 at Kluwer Academic Publishers and is currently published by Springer Science+Business Media, into which Kluwer Academic merged in 2004.

== Editors ==
The founding editor-in-chief was Peter E. Rossi (University of Chicago Booth School of Business), and the current one is Thomas Otter (Goethe University Frankfurt).

== Impact factor ==
According to the Journal Citation Reports, the journal has a 2017 impact factor of 1.000.

== See also ==
- Applied Economics Letters
