= Marketing science =

Field of marketing using scientific methods

Marketing science is a field that approaches marketing—the understanding of customer needs, and the development of approaches by which they might be fulfilled—predominantly through scientific methods, rather than through tools and techniques common with research in the arts or humanities.

The field of marketing science, in the pursuit of "truths" in marketing, is related to, but more general than marketing research, which is oriented towards a specific product, service or campaign.

The earliest published works in Marketing Science are by Frank Bass and John Little . The two are considered to be the founders of the field of Marketing Science.

Before marketing science was formally labeled, its activity appeared as management science within the marketing framework. The interaction between academics and practitioners in marketing science dates back to 1961, with the founding of the Marketing Science Institute. Interest in marketing science as a field grew in the late 1980s and early 1990s as electronic point-of-sale data grew and barcode readers led to a "marketing information revolution".

Before conferences were organized with a "marketing science" label, four meetings were convened as "Market Measurement and Analysis" conferences from 1979 to 1982, sponsored by The Institute of Management Sciences and the Operations Research Society of America. The first officially labeled Marketing Science Conference was hosted by the School of Management at UCLA in 1983.

== Marketing science and Big Data ==
The marketing profession has long relied on data. But as the data flood gets bigger, progressive marketers are turning to big data analysis methods as well as systematic observation, testing and measurement to study broad behavioral patterns, drill down from the aggregate to the individual and produce new insights that improve business outcomes.

== See also ==
- Academy of Marketing Science
