= Reichman University =

Private research university in Herzliya, Israel

- Former names: IDC Herzliya (private college; 1994–2021)
- Type: Private university
- Established: 11 May 1994
- Founder: Uriel Reichman
- Chancellor: Oudi Recanati
- President: Boaz Ganor
- Provost: Amnon Lehavi
- Students: 8,400
- Location: Ha-Universita Street 8, Herzliya, Israel; 32°10′35.67″N 34°50′08.25″E
- Website: www.runi.ac.il

Reichman University (Hebrew: אוניברסיטת רייכמן) is a private university located in Herzliya, Tel Aviv District, Israel. It was founded in 1994 as the Interdisciplinary Center Herzliya (IDC Herzliya) (Note: Hebrew: המרכז הבינתחומי הרצליה) private college, before being rebranded in 2021.

It receives no direct government funding, and in August 2021 became Israel's first and only private university.

== History ==
Reichman University was founded in 1994 by Uriel Reichman as the Israeli private college Interdisciplinary Center Herzliya (IDC Herzliya, Hebrew: המרכז הבינתחומי הרצליה).

The campus is located in the city of Herzliya, Israel, 10 km (6.2 mi) north of Tel Aviv, on the grounds of a former British Air Force base. It served the first squadron of the Israeli Air Force for three months in Israel's War of Independence.

In 2009, Alpha Epsilon Pi opened the first college fraternity in Israel at the IDC.

In 2012, the college attracted controversy for the School of Sustainability being funded by Israel's major polluting companies.

In 2018, the college was authorized by the state council to run several doctoral courses but was not permitted to brand itself as a university. In 2021, the college was permitted to brand itself as a university and changed its name to Reichman University after its founder.

== Organization and administration ==
The university's faculties are:

- Adelson School of Entrepreneurship
- Arison School of Business
- Baruch Ivcher School of Psychology
- Dina Recanati School of Medicine
- Efi Arazi School of Computer Science
- Harry Radzyner Law School
- Lauder School of Government, Diplomacy and Strategy
- Raphael Recanati International School
- Sammy Ofer School of Communications
- School of Sustainability
- Tiomkin School of Economics
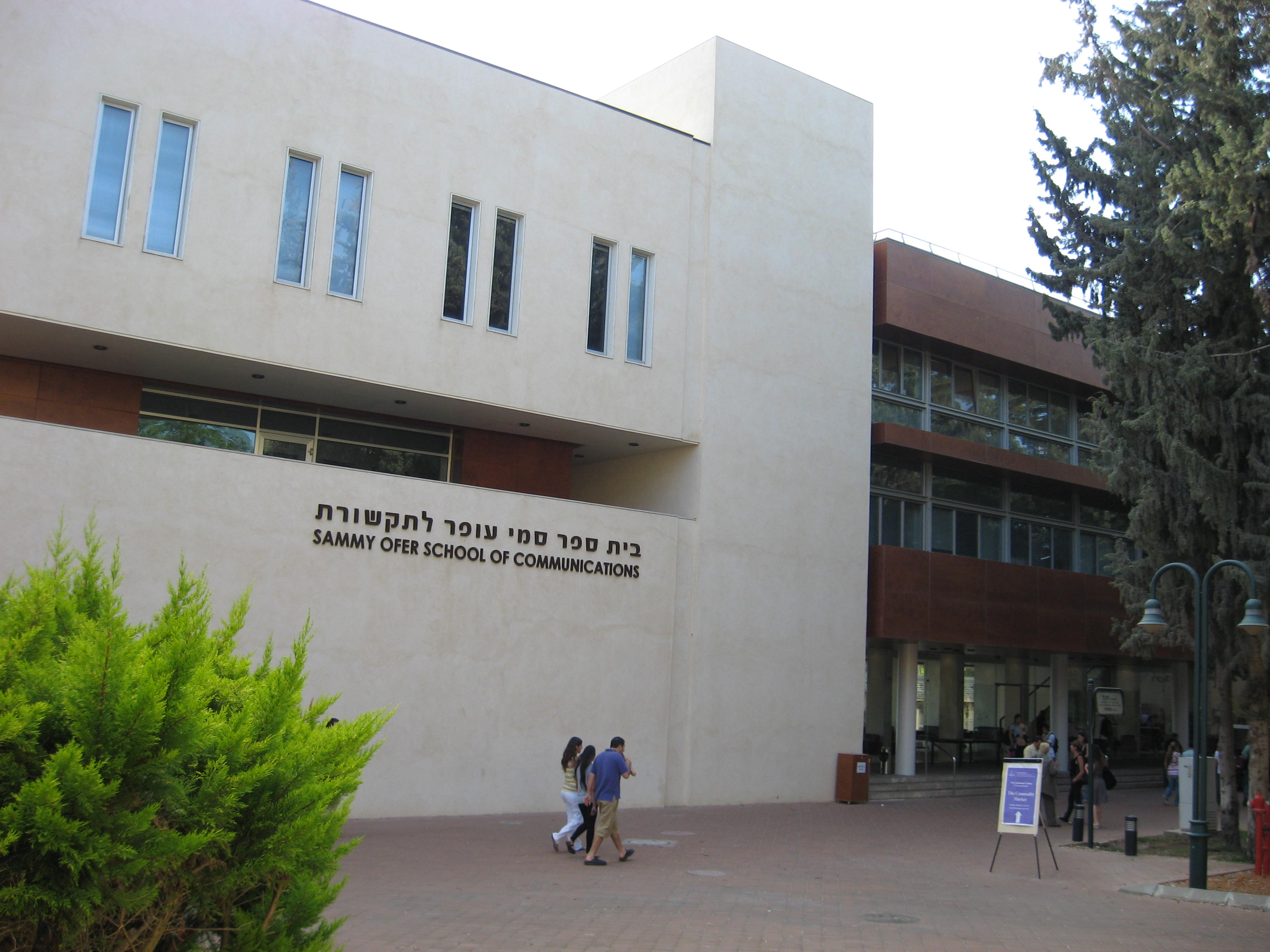
School of Communications building

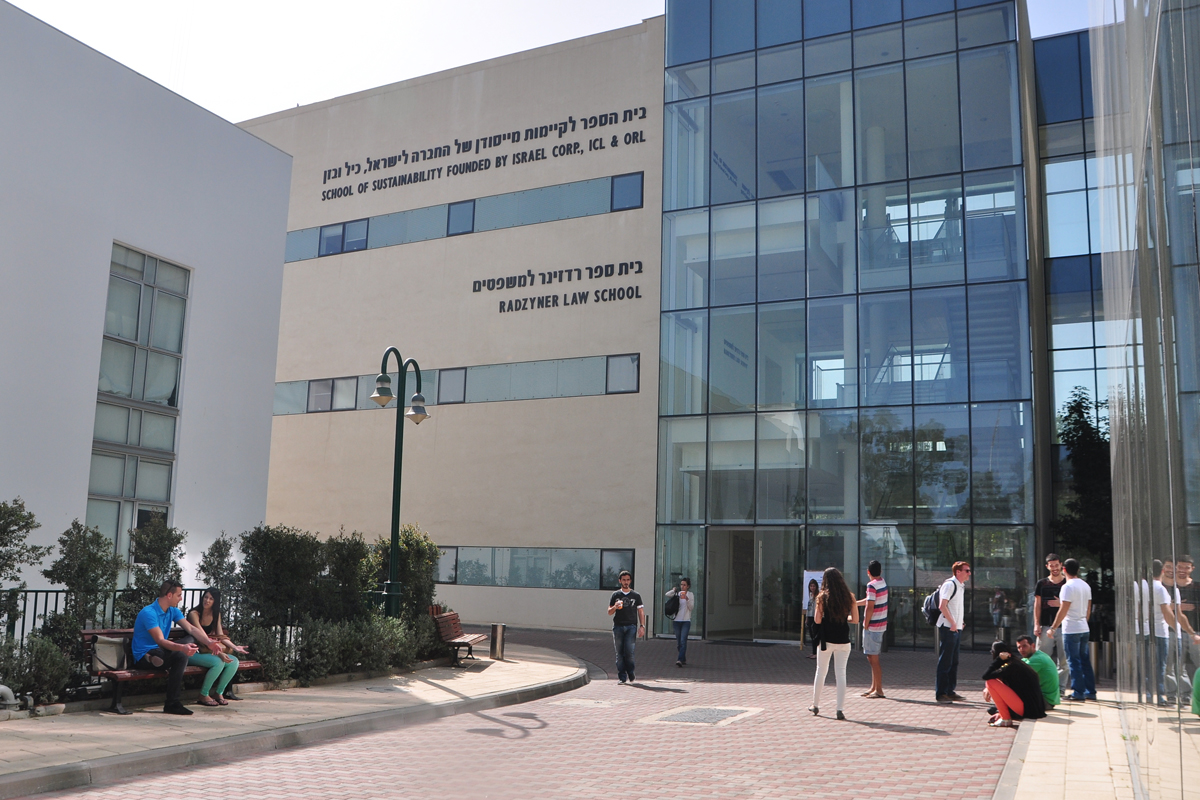
School of Law building

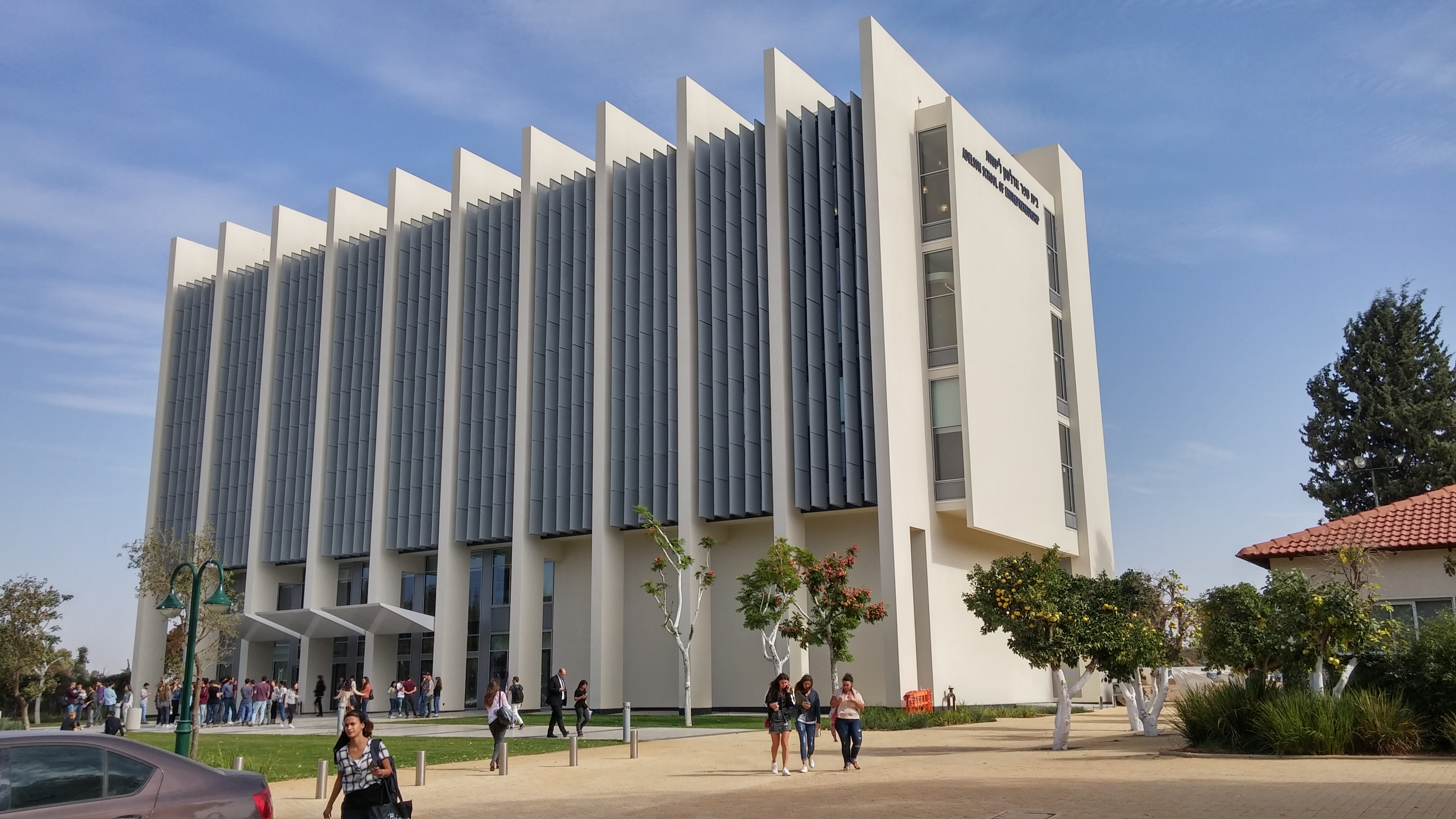
School of Entrepreneurship building

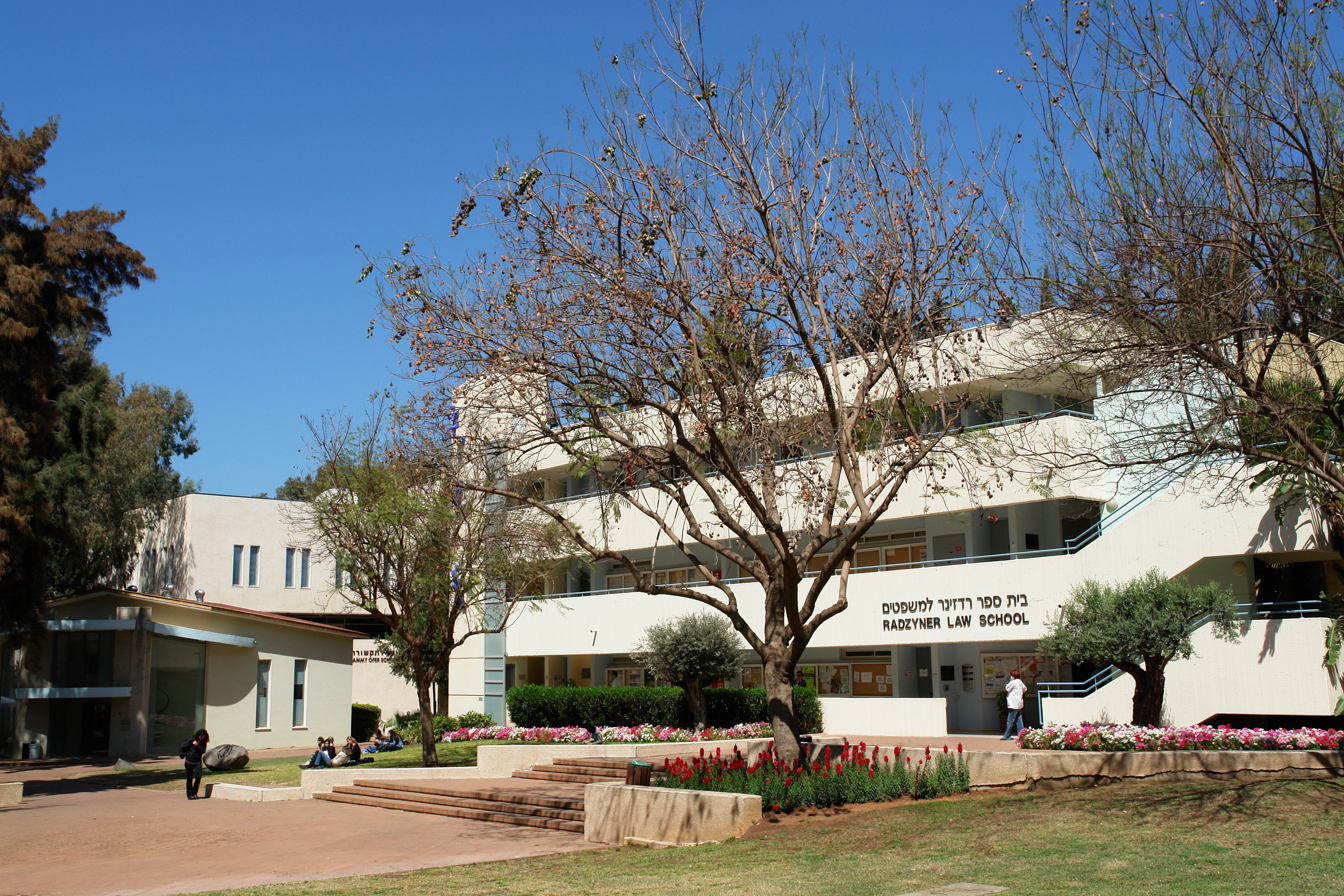
School of Law building

== NoCamels website ==
Reichman University, through the Sammy Ofer School of Communications, sponsors NoCamels, an Israeli news website covering innovation, technology, and science.

== Academics ==
University rankings

Global – Overall
- THE World: 801–1000

In its 2022 rankings, Times Higher Education rated the university in the 801–1000th bracket.

== Herzliya Conference ==
The Herzliya Conference is a forum for policy speeches which is hosted by the Interdisciplinary Center at Herzliya.

== Notable people ==
=== Administration ===
Key leadership include:

- Oudi Recanati, chancellor
- Uriel Reichman, founder, former president, and chairman of the board of directors
- Boaz Ganor, president
- Amnon Lehavi, provost
- Rafi Melnick, former president
- Amnon Rubinstein (1931–2024), former president and former board chair
- Yossi Maaravi, dean of the Adelson School of Entrepreneurship
- Uzi Arad, founding director of the Institute for Policy and Strategy
- Eyal Biyalogorsky, professor of marketing and deputy dean at the Arison School of Business
- Elette Boyle, professor of computer science and director of the Center for Foundations and Applications of Cryptographic Theory

=== Notable staff ===
- Barak Libai, professor of marketing at the Arison School of Business
- Aharon Barak, law professor at master's degree program for commercial law
- Yair Galily, a senior researcher at the International Institute for Counter-Terrorism (ICT) of the Sammy Ofer School of Communications
- Isaac Berzin, senior faculty member
- Anat Brunstein Klomek, associate professor and dean of the Baruch Ivcher School of Psychology
- Nadine Baudot-Trajtenberg, faculty member and lecturer at Tiomkin School of Economics
- Anat Bremler-Barr, professor, Efi Arazi School of Computer Science
- Keren Barak, faculty member
- Anat Berko, lecturer at the Lauder School of Government
- Tal Ben-Shahar
- Ron Malka, former economics lecturer
- Shavit Matias, head of the Program on Diplomacy and Conflict Resolution, and the Executive Leadership of the Institute for Policy and Strategy
- Daniel Rothschild, head of The Institute for Policy and Strategy (IPS), an Israeli think tank in the Lauder School of Government, Diplomacy and Strategy
- Alan Dershowitz
- Michael C. Dorf

=== Notable alumni ===
- Ashager Araro (born 1991), Ethiopian-Israeli activist
- Yael Arad (born 1967), Olympic silver medalist judoka and president of the Olympic Committee of Israel
- Gal Gadot (born 1985), actress and model
- Oren Kessler (born 1982), American political analyst, author, and journalist
- Amit Mekel (born 1980), Israeli Ambassador to Paraguay
- Sagi Muki (born 1992), Olympian and world champion judoka
- Yair Netanyahu (born 1991), podcaster
- Matan Roditi (born 1998), Olympic marathon swimmer

== See also ==
- Education in Israel
