= Eitan Muller =

Israeli professor of marketing

Prof. Eitan Muller
- איתן מילר
- Born: Israel
- Citizenship: Israel
- Education: BSc in mathematics, Technion - Israel Institute of Technology, MBA in marketing from Kellogg Graduate School of Management, Northwestern University, PhD in Managerial economics from Kellogg Graduate School of Management at Northwestern University
- Awards: Distinguished Marketing Scholar Award of the European Marketing Academy (EMAC) (2019)
- Scientific career
- Workplaces: New York University, Reichman University, Tel Aviv University, University of Pennsylvania, Hebrew University of Jerusalem
- Website: Prof. Eitan Muller Website

Eitan Muller is an Israeli professor of marketing at the Stern School of Business at New York University. His research focuses on diffusion of innovation, new product growth and technology, and monetization and pricing.

== Research ==
Muller's research focuses on new product growth, innovation, and new product pricing. His work has been highly influential in the field of marketing, with more than 100 publications that have been cited over 24,000 times and an h-index of 55.

=== Selected publications ===
Muller has authored three books on new product growth and innovation:

- Vijay Mahajan, Eitan Muller, and Jerry Wind, New Product Diffusion Models, Boston: Kluwer Academic Publishers, 2000
- Eitan Muller, Renana Peres, and Vijay Mahajan, Innovation Diffusion and New Product Growth, Boston: MSI Publications, 2009
- Elie Ofek, Eitan Muller, and Barak Libai, Innovation Equity: Assessing and Managing the Monetary Value of New Products and Services, Chicago: University of Chicago Press, 2016. Translated into Chinese and published in 2018 by CITIC Press, Beijing

== Editorial positions ==
Muller has held numerous prestigious editorial positions in academic marketing journals:

- Vice President of Publication, European Marketing Academy (2017–2020)
- Editor-in-Chief, International Journal of Research in Marketing (2012–2015)
- Editorial Review Board positions: Technological Forecasting and Social Change (2003–2008), Marketing Science (1986–2002), Journal of Marketing (2003–2018), Journal of Marketing Research (1994–2020), and International Journal of Research in Marketing (2019–present)

== Awards and honors ==
Muller has received numerous awards for his research and academic contributions:

- European Marketing Academy International Journal of Research in Marketing Best Paper Award (2020)
- Provost Award for Faculty Research Excellence, Reichman University (2020)
- Distinguished Marketing Scholar Award of the European Marketing Academy (EMAC) (2019)
- Emerald Citation of Excellence Award (2016)
- European Marketing Academy International Journal of Research in Marketing Best Paper Award – Finalist (2007, 2010)
- European Marketing Academy International Journal of Research in Marketing Best Paper Award (1995)
