= Marketing Science (journal) =

- Discipline: Business
- Language: English
- Edited by: Puneet Manchanda

Publication details
- History: 1989–present
- Publisher: Institute for Operations Research and the Management Sciences
- Frequency: Bimonthly
- Impact factor: 5.2 (2025)

Standard abbreviations
- ISO 4: Mark. Sci.

Indexing
- ISSN: 0732-2399 (print); 1526-548X (web)
- LCCN: 82645854
- OCLC no.: 08337960

Links
- Journal homepage

Marketing Science is a bimonthly peer-reviewed academic journal published by the Institute for Operations Research and the Management Sciences. It covers operations research and mathematical modeling to analyze marketing. According to the Journal Citation Reports, the journal has a 2025 impact factor of 5.2.

It is ranked third on SCImago journal rank in the field of marketing.

The mission of the journal includes three objectives:

1. Broaden the audience for Marketing Science
2. Increase the impact of the journal
3. Make the process more efficient
