= International Journal of Research in Marketing =

- Discipline: Marketing
- Language: English
- Edited by: Koen Pauwels

Publication details
- History: 1984–present
- Publisher: Elsevier
- Frequency: Quarterly
- Impact factor: 7.5 (2024)

Standard abbreviations
- ISO 4: Int. J. Res. Mark.

Indexing
- CODEN: IJRME6
- ISSN: 0167-8116 (print); 1873-8001 (web)
- LCCN: sn84011614
- OCLC no.: 222765922

Links
- Journal homepage; Online archive

International Journal of Research in Marketing is a quarterly peer-reviewed academic journal published by Elsevier. It is an official journal of the European Marketing Academy. The journal was established in 1984 and is published by Elsevier. The editor-in-chief: is Koen Pauwels (Northeastern University).

== Past editors-in-chief ==
The following persons have been editor-in-chief:

- Berend Wierenga (1984–1986)
- Gilles Laurent (1987–1989)
- Piet Vanden Abeele (1990–1994)
- John Saunders (1995–1997)
- Jan-Benedict Steenkamp (1998–2000)
- Hubert Gatignon (2001–2006)
- Stefan Stremersch (2006–2009)
- Donald R. Lehmann (2006–2009)
- Marnik Dekimpe (2009–2012)
- Jacob Goldenberg (2012–2015)
- Eitan Muller (2012–2015)
- Roland Rust (2015–2018)
- P.K.Kannan (2018–2021)
- Martin Schreier (2021–2024)
- Koen Pauwels (2025–present)

== Abstracting and indexing ==
The journal is abstracted and indexed in:

- Current Contents/Social & Behavioral Sciences
- Current Index to Statistics
- Journal of Economic Literature
- Mathematical Reviews
- ProQuest databases
- Social Sciences Citation Index
- Scopus

According to the Journal Citation Reports, the journal has a 2024 impact factor of 7.5.
