= Timeline of the opioid epidemic =

The timeline of the opioid epidemic includes selected events related to the origins of Stamford, Connecticut-based Purdue Pharma, the Sackler family, the development and marketing of oxycodone, selected FDA activities related to the abuse and misuse of opioids, the recognition of the opioid epidemic, the social impact of the crisis, lawsuits against Purdue and the Sackler family.

- 1911 - 1990s According to the FDA's Timeline of Selected FDA Activities and Significant Events Addressing Opioid Misuse and Abuse, before the 1990s, most opioid pain medications were used to manage pain that was either acute or related to cancer. The FDA said that there was an increase in the use of opioids because physicians were not treating "chronic non-cancer pain" and mental health.
- 1952 Mortimer David Sackler (1916–2010) and Raymond became the co-chairmen of a small Greenwich Village-based pharmaceutical company financed by their brother Arthur. The Purdue Frederick Company, became the Stamford, Connecticut-based Purdue Pharma. With Raymond, he established pharmaceutical companies in Austria, Canada, Cyprus, Germany, Switzerland, and the UK.
- 1987 Arthur Sackler died. At that time Purdue Pharma was a small drug company.
- 1987 In May, the FDA approved the "first formulation of an opioid pain medicine that allowed dosing every 12 hours instead of every 4 to 6 hours"—MS Contin, morphine sulfate.
- In 1995, Purdue Pharma laboratory tests showed that "68% of the oxycodone could be extracted from an OxyContin tablet when crushed".
- 1995 In December the FDA approved OxyContin—controlled-release oxycodone which was the "first formulation of oxycodone that allowed dosing every 12 hours instead of every 4 to 6 hours." The FDA said that soon after its approval, OxyContin became a "focal point of opioid abuse issues".
- July 1996 A July 1996 study co-authored by Paul D. Goldenheim MD - who later became Purdue's chief medical officer - published in the Journal of Clinical Pharmacology reported that the controlled-release (CR) formulation - by mouth - had a variable duration of action ranging from 10–12 hours. The report by eight authors said that, "[t]reatment with CR oxycodone was safe and effective in this study, and its characteristics will be beneficial in the treatment of pain."
- 1996 Purdue Pharma "began a massive marketing campaign", based on a "unique claim" for OxyContin, with FDA permission, that, "as a long-acting opioid, it might be less likely to cause abuse and addiction than shorter-acting painkillers like Percocet."
- 1997-1999 According to a 29 May 2018 article in The New York Times, between 1997 and 1999, Purdue "sales representatives, used the words 'street value', 'crush', or 'snort' in 117 internal notes recording their visits to doctors or other medical professionals".
- 1997 In the 2018 Suffolk County v. Purdue lawsuit, the County said that, "In 1997, Richard Sackler, Kathe Sackler, and other Purdue executives determined—and recorded in secret internal correspondence—that doctors had the crucial misconception that OxyContin was weaker than morphine, which led them to prescribe OxyContin much more often, even as a substitute for Tylenol." According to CNN, the presiding judge in the case, Judge Sanders, said that their discussions appeared to be tactical as they looked for ways "to promote the sales of OxyContin (particularly in higher doses), to encourage doctors to prescribe the drug over longer periods of time, and to circumvent safeguards put in place to stop illegal prescriptions."
- 1998 Purdue's audiotapes, brochures, videotapes, literature and its website "Partners Against Pain", "claimed that the risk of addiction from OxyContin was extremely small."
- 1998 In November the FDA approved Actiq (fentanyl).
- 2001 The New York Times journalist Barry Meier, who is the author of Pain Killer: A Wonder Drug's Trail of Addiction and Death, began investigating Purdue Pharma and OxyContin, then a relatively unknown drug made by a relatively unknown family the Sacklers, who were at that time "one of the wealthiest families in the United States". In an 24 August 2001 taped-interview with three top Purdue executives, CEO Michael Friedman, Howard Udell and Dr. Paul Goldenheim, the executives told Meier that "they had learned of OxyContin's growing abuse only in early 2000, a statement they also made before congressional committees".
- 2001 The number of prescriptions of OxyContin rose to more than 14 million in 2001 and 2002 up from 316,000 prescriptions in 1996. This represented almost $3 billion in sales compared to $44 million in 1996.
- 2002 In 2002 during the United States Senate Committee on Health, Education, Labor, and Pensions Hearing on "OxyContin: balancing risks and benefits", Paul Goldenheim reported that in 2001 alone Purdue spent $200 million marketing OxyContin. Purdue directly sponsored and/or gave grants for over "20,000 pain-related educational programs" influencing doctors' prescribing in the United States from 1996 to July 2002.
- c. 2002 Federal prosecutors with the Justice Department began a 4-year-long investigation into Purdue Pharma.
- 2003 The New York Times journalist Barry Meier, published Pain Killer: A Wonder Drug's Trail of Addiction and Death, A 2004 New York Times review of Pain Killer, described how "For years, doctors who prescribed OxyContin were told that the risk of addiction to the painkiller was less than 1 percent. Only after the drug had devastated thousands of lives was it revealed that this figure, touted as scientific fact, was based on a small study that had no relevance for the general public."
- 2006 According to a 1 September 2006 article published in Therapeutics and Clinical Risk Management, Oxycodone, a controlled-release tablet was intended to be taken every 12 hours.
- 2006 In 2006, Rudolph W. Giuliani was lead counsel and lead spokesmen for Purdue Pharma during their negotiations with federal prosecutors over charges that Purdue had misled the public about OxyContin's addictive properties. Purdue was a client of the firm Bracewell & Giuliani. The agreement reached resulted in some of Purdue executives paying fines amounting to $634.5 million.
- 4 October 2007 Kentucky officials sued Purdue because of widespread Oxycontin abuse in Appalachia. A lawsuit filed by Kentucky's then-Attorney General Greg Stumbo and Pike County officials demanded millions in compensation. Eight years later, on 23 December 2015, Kentucky settled with Purdue for $24 million.
- 2007 According to a 25 May 2018 CNBC article, Rudolph W. Giuliani, who was representing Purdue Pharma at the time, held meetings with Alice S. Fisher who was head of the United States Assistant Attorney General for the Criminal Division from 2005 to 2008. Following these meetings, Fisher "chose not to pursue indictments against Purdue Pharma for their role in opioid abuse".
- 10 May 2007 Purdue Frederick Company Inc, an affiliate of Purdue Pharma, along with 3 company executives, pleaded guilty to criminal charges of misbranding OxyContin by claiming that it was less addictive and less subject to abuse and diversion than other opioids" after the U.S. Department of Justice investigated the allegations. In May 2007, John Brownlee, the federal attorney in Roanoke in rural Virginia met privately with Meier to tell him that his August 2001 interview with Friedman, Udell and Goldenheim, had helped "inform" the DOJ's investigation. Meier and a New York Times photographer met the three executives on 10 May 2007, as they had left the federal courthouse in Roanoke, heading to their corporate jet to go back to Connecticut, just before Brownlee's public announcement of their guilty pleas of "misbranding" OxyContin. The holding company, Purdue Frederick, which was "affiliated with Purdue Pharma pleaded guilty to a felony charge that it had fraudulently claimed to doctors and patients that OxyContin would cause less abuse and addiction than competing short-acting narcotics like Percocet and Vicodin." Purdue Pharma's three top executives president Michael Friedman, top lawyer, Howard R. Udell, and former chief medical officer Paul D. Goldenheim, pleaded guilty as individuals to misleading the public about Oxycontin's risk of addiction, a misbranding charge—a criminal violation. At their sentencing hearing in July 2007, Judge James P. Jones of the United States District Court sentenced Friedman, Udell and Goldenheim to three years' probation", and community service in drug treatment programs and US$19 million, US$8 million and US$7.5 million in fines, respectively. The US$600 million fine was one of the largest pharmaceutical settlements in U.S. history.
- 2015 An article in the Annual Review of Public Health, reported that, "Between 1996 and 2002, Purdue Pharma funded more than 20,000 pain-related educational programs through direct sponsorship or financial grants and launched a multifaceted campaign to encourage long-term use of [opioid painkillers] for chronic non-cancer pain. As part of this campaign, Purdue provided financial support to the American Pain Society, the American Academy of Pain Medicine, the Federation of State Medical Boards, the Joint Commission, pain patient groups, and other organizations. In turn, these groups all advocated for more aggressive identification and treatment of pain, especially use of [opioid painkillers]."
- 2014 The Office of the Attorney General (OAG) of the State of New York began an investigation of Purdue's Abuse and Diversion Detection (ADD) Program and Purdue's unbranded website www.inthefaceofpain.com. In 2015, Purdue entered into an Assurance of Discontinuance with the New York Attorney General.
- 2016 Investigative journalists Harriet Ryan, Lisa Girion, and Scott Glover of the Los Angeles Times published the results of their extensive investigation into OxyContin, reporting that Purdue had "marketed OxyContin for its supposed ability to provide 12 hours of pain relief", which put it at a competitive advantage over other pain killers. However,"[e]ven before OxyContin went on the market, clinical trials showed many patients weren't getting 12 hours of relief. Since the drug's debut in 1996, the company has been confronted with additional evidence, including complaints from doctors, reports from its own sales reps and independent research." In response to the series, Senator Edward J. Markey, (D-MASS) asked the DOJ, the FDA, and the Federal Trade Commission to launch an investigation into Purdue Pharma.
- 2016 According to an 25 October 2018 NPR report, Suffolk County, Long Island sued several Sackler family members. (Note: The lawyer for Suffolk County, Paul Hanly, is "also a lead attorney in a huge civil action playing out in federal court in Cleveland, Ohio, involving opioid manufacturers and distributors".)
- October 2017 Journalist Christopher Glazek breaks news in Esquire that Purdue Pharma, the company that produces OxyContin, is owned by a single family, the Sacklers. A significant portion of the family’s nearly $14 billion fortune derived from Purdue Pharma. More than 200,000 people in the United States have died from overdoses of OxyContin and other prescription painkillers at the time the article was published.
- January 2017 The city of Everett, Washington sued Purdue asking for a yet to be determined reimbursement related to costs of policing, housing, health care, rehabilitation, criminal justice system, park and recreations department, as well as to the loss of life or compromised quality of life of the citizens of the city directly.
- Summer 2017 Craig Landau became CEO of Purdue Pharma L.P. and Purdue Pharma Inc.
- December 2017 Craig Landau placed advertisements in major newspapers, including USA Today, The Wall Street Journal, and The New York Times that "emphasized the so-called abuse deterrent properties of Purdue's drugs, without disclosing that they provide no protection against the most common form of abuse—simply swallowing the pills."
- May 2018 Six states—Florida, Nevada, North Carolina, North Dakota, Tennessee and Texas—filed lawsuits charging deceptive marketing practices, adding to 16 previously filed lawsuits by other U.S. states and Puerto Rico.
- February 2018 Purdue Pharma said that it had "restructured and significantly reduced [their] commercial operation and will no longer be promoting opioids to prescribers." Purdue said it reduced its sales force by 50% and contacted doctors in February "telling them that salespeople will no longer go to clinics to talk about their opioid products."
- 1 June 2018 Massachusetts Attorney General Maura Healey notified eight members of the Sackler family (Note: According to the February 2018 article in The Guardian, three of Mortimer David Sackler's children, Ilene Sackler Lefcourt, Kathe Sackler, and Mortimer David Alfons (Mortimer) Sackler are currently on Purdue Pharma's Board of Directors along with Theresa Sackler, the third wife of Mortimer David Sackler. Current Purdue Board of Directors also include Raymond Sackler's sons, Jonathan Sackler, Richard Stephen Sackler, former Purdue CEO and current director, and his son David Sackler. Richard wife, Beverly Sackler, is a former Purdue director.) Richard Stephen Sackler (born March 1945), former Purdue CEO and current director, son of Purdue's co-founder Raymond Sackler (1920–2017), Beverly Sackler—Richard's wife and former Purdue director, David Sackler, Richard's son and current Purdue director, Ilene Sackler Lefcourt, Purdue Director and daughter of Purdue's co-founder, Mortimer David Sackler (1916–2010), Jonathan Sackler, Purdue director and Raymond's son, Kathe Sackler, Purdue director and Mortimer David Sackler's daughter, Mortimer David Alfons (Mortimer) Sackler, Purdue director and Mortimer Sackler's son, Theresa Sackler, third wife of Mortimer David Sackler and Purdue director, as well as Purdue's, Peter Boer, Judith Lewent, Cecil Pickett, Paulo Costa, Ralph Snyderman, John Stewart, Mark Timney, and Craig Landau of her intention to file a 300-page lawsuit accusing Purdue and eight members of the Sackler family and nine other people currently or formerly associated with the company "of misleading doctors and patients about the risks of OxyContin." In December an amended complaint was filed, with 700 redacted sections. Documents filed as part of a lawsuit against the company that ... In an email, that was part of the lawsuit, Healey alleged that "Purdue deceived patients and doctors to get them to prescribe and take the addictive drug." Healey says the complaint saying the 189 paragraphs of the lawsuit should be made public. Healey said in the court complaint that, "Revealing the truth about Purdue's misconduct is important to achieve justice and make sure deception like Purdue's never happens again."
- June 2018 NBC described Healey's lawsuit that named eight of the Sackler family members as an "unusual step".
- 14 August 2018 New York State filed lawsuit Suffolk County v. Purdue New York v Purdue Pharma LP et al No. 400016/2018 the New York State Supreme Court against the Stamford, Connecticut-based company Purdue Pharma LP, which created and manufactures OxyContin, "one of the most widely used and prescribed opioid drugs on the market", and Purdue's owners, the Sacklers accusing them of "widespread fraud and deception in the marketing of opioids, and contributing to the opioid crisis, the nationwide epidemic that has killed thousands."
- 20 December 2018 George Jepsen, the Connecticut Attorney General, brought a lawsuit against Purdue Pharma et al. Purdue denied the allegations.
- 21 December 2018 Massachusetts Attorney General Maura Healey filed an amended complaint to Suffolk County v. Purdue with 700 redacted sections. According to CNN, in a ruling by Suffolk County Superior Judge Janet Sanders, an "unredacted amended complaint must be publicly released by February 1". In response, Purdue Pharma filed a motion on 30 January to stay Judge Sanders' order that "could expose details about one of America's richest families and their connection to the nation's opioid crisis." In the lawsuit, Healey said that eight members of the Sackler family are "personally responsible" for the deception. She alleges they "micromanaged" a "deceptive sales campaign."
- January 2019 By January 2019, 36 states were suing Purdue Pharma.
- 31 January 2019 A new lawsuit's disclosures says that an email from a Sackler family member revealed a push for high-dose OxyContin.
- January 31 On 31 January, a Massachusetts state judge agreed with The Times and other media organizations, that the entire complaint related to Sussex v. Purdue, should be made public in spite of Purdue's efforts to block the release.
- 2 February 2019 "The McKinsey disclosures are part of a lawsuit Massachusetts filed against Purdue Pharma, accusing the company of misleading doctors and patients about the safety of opioid use. Even when the company knew patients were addicted and dying, it still tried to boost sales of opioids", the lawsuit alleges, adding, "All the while, Purdue peddled falsehoods to keep patients away from safer alternatives."
- May 2019 The Oklahoma case against Purdue Pharma will go to trial in May 2019; the first of more than forty states suing Purdue Pharma.
- 22 December 2020 The U.S. Department of Justice sued supermarket chain Walmart, accusing its pharmacies of not adequately screening painkiller prescriptions and thereby fueling the opioid epidemic.
- 3 February 2021 Consultancy McKinsey and Company agreed to pay $573 million to 47 state governments to settle claims it advised "Purdue Pharma and other drug makers to aggressively market opioid painkillers."
