= Massachusetts v. Purdue =

U.S. opioid drugs lawsuit

Massachusetts v. Purdue is a lawsuit filed on August 14, 2018, suing the Stamford, Connecticut-based company Purdue Pharma LP, which created and manufactures OxyContin, "one of the most widely used and prescribed opioid drugs on the market", and Purdue's owners, the Sacklers accusing them of "widespread fraud and deception in the marketing of opioids, and contributing to the opioid crisis, the nationwide epidemic that has killed thousands." Purdue denied the allegations.

== The case ==
On June 1, 2018, Massachusetts Attorney General Maura Healey notified eight members of the Sackler family (Note: According to the February 2018 article in The Guardian, three of Mortimer David Sackler's children, Ilene Sackler Lefcourt, Kathe Sackler, and Mortimer David Alfons (Mortimer) Sackler are currently on Purdue Pharma's Board of Directors along with Theresa Sackler, the third wife of Mortimer David Sackler. Current Purdue Board of Directors also include Raymond Sackler's sons, Jonathan Sackler, Richard Stephen Sackler, former Purdue CEO and current director, and his son David Sackler. Richard wife, Beverly Sackler, is a former Purdue director.) Richard Stephen Sackler, Beverly Sackler, David Sackler, Ilene Sackler Lefcourt, Jonathan Sackler, Kathe Sackler, Mortimer David Alfons (Mortimer) Sackler, Theresa Sackler, as well as Purdue's Peter Boer, Judith Lewent, Cecil Pickett, Paulo Costa, Ralph Snyderman, John Stewart, Mark Timney, and Craig Landau of her intention to file a 300-page lawsuit accusing Purdue and eight members of the Sackler family and nine other people currently or formerly associated with the company "of misleading doctors and patients about the risks of OxyContin." Healey alleged that "Purdue deceived patients and doctors to get them to prescribe and take the addictive drug." Healey said in the court complaint that, "Revealing the truth about Purdue's misconduct is important to achieve justice and make sure deception like Purdue's never happens again." On June 16, NBC described Healey's lawsuit that named eight of the Sackler family members, as an "unusual step".

On December 21, 2018, AG Healey filed an amended complaint to Massachusetts v. Purdue with 700 redacted sections. Purdue Pharma had unsuccessfully attempted to prevent documents that were part of the AG's complaint, public. According to CNN, in a ruling by Massachusetts Superior Court Judge Janet L. Sanders, an "unredacted amended complaint must be publicly released by February 1". In response, Purdue Pharma filed a motion on January 30 to stay Judge Sanders' order that "could expose details about one of America's richest families and their connection to the nation's opioid crisis." In the lawsuit, Healey said that eight members of the Sackler family are "personally responsible" for the deception. She alleges they "micromanaged" a "deceptive sales campaign." On January 31, Judge Sanders agreed with The Times and other media organizations, that the entire complaint related to Massachusetts v. Purdue, should be made public, in spite of Purdue's efforts to block the release.

== Background ==
In 1995, Purdue Pharma laboratory tests showed that "68% of the oxycodone could be extracted from an OxyContin tablet when crushed". A July 1996 study co-authored by Paul D. Goldenheim MD - who later became Purdue's chief medical officer - published in the Journal of Clinical Pharmacology reported that the controlled-release (CR) formulation - by mouth - had a variable duration of action ranging from 10 to 12 hours. The report by eight authors said that, "[t]reatment with CR oxycodone was safe and effective in this study, and its characteristics will be beneficial in the treatment of pain." The report said that the study was independent of Purdue Pharma.

In 1996, Purdue Pharma "began a massive marketing campaign", based on a "unique claim" for OxyContin, with FDA permission, that, "as a long-acting opioid, it might be less likely to cause abuse and addiction than shorter-acting painkillers like Percocet." By 1998, Purdue's audiotapes, brochures, videotapes, literature and its website "Partners Against Pain", "claimed that the risk of addiction from OxyContin was extremely small."

In 2001 New York Times journalist Barry Meier, who is the author of Pain Killer: A Wonder Drug's Trail of Addiction and Death, began investigating Purdue Pharma and OxyContin, then a relatively unknown drug made by a relatively unknown family the Sacklers, who were at that time "one of the wealthiest families in the United States". In an August 24, 2001 taped-interview with three top Purdue executives, CEO Michael Friedman, Howard Udell and Dr. Paul Goldenheim, the executives told Meier that "they had learned of OxyContin's growing abuse only in early 2000, a statement they also made before congressional committees".

The number of prescriptions of OxyContin rose to more than 14 million in 2001 and 2002 up from 316, 000 prescriptions in 1996. This represented almost $3 billion in sales compared to $44 million in 1996. Purdue directly sponsored and/or gave grants for over "20, 000 pain-related educational programs" influencing doctors' prescribing in the United States from 1996 to July 2002. In 2002 during the United States Senate Committee on Health, Education, Labor, and Pensions Hearing on "OxyContin: balancing risks and benefits", Paul Goldenheim reported that in 2001 alone Purdue spent $200 million marketing OxyContin.

A 2004 New York Times review of Meier's 2003 book, Pain Killer, described how "For years, doctors who prescribed OxyContin were told that the risk of addiction to the painkiller was less than 1 percent. Only after the drug had devastated thousands of lives was it revealed that this figure, touted as scientific fact, was based on a small study that had no relevance for the general public."

In 2014, the Office of the Attorney General (OAG) of the State of New York began an investigation of Purdue's Abuse and Diversion Detection (ADD) Program and Purdue's unbranded website www.inthefaceofpain.com. In 2015, Purdue entered into an Assurance of Discontinuance with the New York Attorney General.

In a 2015 article in the Annual Review of Public Health, researchers wrote that, "Between 1996 and 2002, Purdue Pharma funded more than 20,000 pain-related educational programs through direct sponsorship or financial grants and launched a multifaceted campaign to encourage long-term use of [opioid painkillers] for chronic non-cancer pain. As part of this campaign, Purdue provided financial support to the American Pain Society, the American Academy of Pain Medicine, the Federation of State Medical Boards, the Joint Commission, pain patient groups, and other organizations. In turn, these groups all advocated for more aggressive identification and treatment of pain, especially use of [opioid painkillers]."

In 2016, investigative journalists Harriet Ryan, Lisa Girion, and Scott Glover of the Los Angeles Times published the results of their extensive investigation into OxyContin, reporting that Purdue had "marketed OxyContin for its supposed ability to provide 12 hours of pain relief", which put it at a competitive advantage over other pain killers. However,"[e]ven before OxyContin went on the market, clinical trials showed many patients weren't getting 12 hours of relief. Since the drug's debut in 1996, the company has been confronted with additional evidence, including complaints from doctors, reports from its own sales reps and independent research." In response to the series, Senator Edward J. Markey, (D-MASS) asked the DOJ, the FDA, and the Federal Trade Commission to launch an investigation into Purdue Pharma. In 2017, "Purdue sold $1.74 billion of OxyContin...according to Symphony Health Solutions". Governor Andrew Cuomo said, "The opioid epidemic was manufactured by unscrupulous distributors who developed a $400 billion industry pumping human misery into our communities."

On October 30, 2017, The New Yorker published a lengthy exposé on Raymond Sackler, who was the co-founder along with his brother Mortimer Sackler of Purdue Pharma, and the Sackler family, that linked Raymond and his older brother, Arthur Sackler's business acumen with the rise of direct pharmaceutical marketing and eventually to the rise of addiction to OxyContin. The article implies that the Sackler family bears a moral responsibility for the opioid epidemic in the United States.

By August 2018, the U.S. Food and Drug Administration continued to approve Purdue's "scientific and medical information it has provided to doctors". By 2018, 27 States, including Puerto Rico, counties and cities, including New York City, Bridgeport, New Haven and Waterbury, had filed lawsuits, accusing "Opioid makers and distributors" of "using deceptive marketing to sell the painkillers".

== Prior history ==
A 2004 New York Times review of Meier's 2003 book, Pain Killer, described how "For years, doctors who prescribed OxyContin were told that the risk of addiction to the painkiller was less than 1 percent. Only after the drug had devastated thousands of lives was it revealed that this figure, touted as scientific fact, was based on a small study that had no relevance for the general public." The U.S. Department of Justice investigated the allegations.

On May 10, 2007, Purdue Frederick Company Inc, a holding company affiliated with Purdue Pharma, along with 3 company executives, pleaded guilty to criminal charges of misbranding OxyContin by claiming that it was less addictive and less subject to abuse and diversion than other opioids" after the U.S. Department of Justice investigated the allegations. They pleaded guilty to a felony charge that it had fraudulently to misled the public about Oxycontin's risk of addiction and had claimed to doctors and patients that OxyContin would cause less abuse and addiction than competing short-acting narcotics like Percocet and Vicodin." It was fined a total of US$600 million, one of the largest pharmaceutical settlements in U.S. history was put on five years' probation.

Purdue Pharma's three top executives, president Michael Friedman, top lawyer, Howard R. Udell, and former chief medical officer Paul D. Goldenheim, pleaded guilty as individuals to misleading the public about Oxycontin's risk of addiction, a misbranding charge — a criminal violation. At their sentencing hearing in July 2007, Judge James P. Jones of the United States District Court sentenced Friedman, Udell and Goldenheim to three years' probation", and community service in drug treatment programs and US$19 million, US$8 million and US$7.5 million in fines, respectively, representing $34.5 million in fines.

Just before the trial, John Brownlee, the federal attorney in Roanoke in rural Virginia met privately with Barry Meier, author of Pain Killer: A Wonder Drug's Trail of Addiction and Death, to tell him that his August 2001 interview with the three top Purdue executives Friedman, Udell, and Goldenheim, had helped "inform" the DOJ's investigation. Meier and a New York Times photographer met the three executives on May 10, 2007, as they had left the federal courthouse in Roanoke, heading to their corporate jet to go back to Connecticut, just before Brownlee's public announcement of their guilty pleas of "misbranding" OxyContin.

According to a May 25, 2018 CNBC article, Rudolph W. Giuliani, who was representing Purdue Pharma as lead counsel and lead spokesmen during their 2006-2007 negotiations with federal prosecutors over charges that the Purdue had misled the public about OxyContin's addictive properties, held meetings with Alice S. Fisher who was head of the United States Assistant Attorney General for the Criminal Division from 2005 to 2008. Following these meetings, Fisher "chose not to pursue indictments against Purdue Pharma for their role in opioid abuse".

== Related law suits ==
According to the NPR, the city of Everett, Washington filed a lawsuit in In February 2017, against Purdue Pharma calling for Purdue to cover the costs of the city's opioid crisis which the city claims Purdue caused through their negligence. In January 2018 New York City filed a "lawsuit seeking $500 million from Purdue and seven other opioid makers and distributors to fight the opioid crisis there". A coalition of 41 States is "investigating the opioid industry". In 2016 alone, there were about 3,086 deaths in New York state and over 1,100 in New York City.

On December 20, 2018 George Jepsen, the Connecticut Attorney General, brought a lawsuit against Purdue Pharma et al.

According to a December 2, 2018 article in Vox opioid companies, including Purdue, have faced an "increasing number of lawsuits from cities, counties, and states blaming the drug manufacturers for irresponsibly fostering the current overdose crisis."

According to a January 31, 2019 article in The Guardian, the Oklahoma case against Purdue Pharma will go to trial in May 2019; the first of more than forty states suing Purdue Pharma.

=== New York v Purdue Pharma LP et al ===
New York State Governor Andrew M. Cuomo and Attorney General Barbara D. Underwood announced on August 14, 2018, that they had filed a lawsuit Suffolk County v. Purdue or New York v Purdue Pharma LP et al at the New York State Supreme Court against the Stamford, Connecticut-based company Purdue Pharma LP, which created and manufactures OxyContin, "one of the most widely used and prescribed opioid drugs on the market", and Purdue's owners, the Sacklers The complaint against Purdue Pharma L.P., Purdue Pharma Inc., Pursue Frederick Company, Inc. ("Purdue") and defendants, alleges a "decades-long and continuing pattern of persistent deceptive and illegal conduct, whereby Purdue's misled prescribers and patients about the risks of its opioids, including OxyContin, intentionally understating the risks and overstating the benefits of these powerful and dangerous drugs". (Note: The lawsuit Suffolk County v. Purdue, or New York v Purdue Pharma LP et al or refers to Supreme Court of the State of New York County of Suffolk and the People of the State of New York by Barbara D. Underwood, : Attorney General of the State of New York v. Purdue PHARMA L.P., : Purdue Pharma INC., Purdue Frederick Company, INC., and defendants Index No.: 400016/2018) They are accused of "widespread fraud and deception in the marketing of opioids, and contributing to the opioid crisis, the nationwide epidemic that has killed thousands." NPR's WSHU described Suffolk County's August 2018 lawsuit as "rare"—while there are "tens of thousands of opioid lawsuits" in the United States naming Purdue Pharma—the Suffolk County lawsuit specifically names the Sackler family. According to an October 30, 2017 The New Yorker, there are eight members of the Sackler family, representing three generations, who were serving on Purdue Pharma's board of directors in 2017. Attorney Paul Hanley, who represents Suffolk County in the lawsuit, said in a radio interview that, the Sackler family "marketed the drug while knowing it was promoting faulty information about it." "[They] were instrumental in developing the entire marketing program for OxyContin, which was predicated upon entirely false science … or no science at all … and because among other things, they have profited grandly from sales of OxyContin." According to Paul Hanley, who is representing Suffolk County in Suffolk County v. Purdue, said that because of the release of new evidence in October 2018, he expanded the 2016 lawsuit to include the Sackler family.

== See also ==
- Babcock v. Jackson
