= Pharmaceutical fraud =

Type of criminal activity

Pharmaceutical fraud is when pharmaceutical companies engage in illegal, fraudulent activities to the detriment of patients and/or insurers. Examples include counterfeit drugs that do not contain the active ingredient, false claims in packaging and marketing, suppression of negative information regarding the efficacy or safety of the drug, and violating pricing regulations.

== Definition ==
Pharma fraud refers to:

- Trade involving counterfeit drugs: the practice of falsely claiming to be an authorized product of another firm, including but not limited to the use of another firm's mark to deceive the public.
- Deliberately manufacturing and marketing products that do not contain the required active ingredients or not contain the right amount of active ingredient.
- Packaging and labeling of drugs that make false claims regarding medical properties, including but not limited to the active medical ingredients, the date of expiration of products, or the methods of storage.
- Marketing of products using false claims regarding the efficacy of the product which will lead to the irrational use of medicines or deliberately failing to provide information about safety concerns of the product.
- Deliberate suppression of data, including evidence from clinical trials, that reveal adverse effects of the medicine.
- Serious compliance deficiencies with Current Good Manufacturing Practice (CGMP).
- Overbilling.
- Bait & Switch in which the purchaser receives a cheaper product at the retail level.

== History ==
Because of a lack of regulation and enforcement, the quality, safety and efficacy of both imported and locally manufactured medicines in many developing countries cannot be guaranteed. Subsequently, smuggling and illegal importation of drugs are common. Substandard and counterfeit drugs are then not only sold in these countries but also exported or re-exported. According to the World Customs Organization, counterfeit drugs are a $200 billion a year industry that kills hundreds of thousands of people annually.

== Types of fraud ==
In the United States, there are several different schemes used to defraud the health care system which are particular to the pharmaceutical industry:

- Good Manufacturing Practice violations
- Off-label marketing
- Best Price fraud
- Continuing Medical Education fraud
- Medicaid price reporting
- Manufactured compound drugs
- Kickbacks

=== GMP Violations ===
These relate to the Good Manufacturing Practice (GMP) Regulations, which require manufacturers to have adequately equipped manufacturing facilities, adequately trained personnel, stringent control over the manufacturing process, appropriate laboratory controls, complete and accurate records, reports, appropriate finished product examination, and so on. Certain violations of the Good Manufacturing Practice Regulations may be the basis for a False Claims Act lawsuit.

=== Off-label marketing ===
Though physicians may prescribe drugs for off-label usage known as off-label marketing, the Food and Drug Administration (FDA) prohibits drug manufacturers from marketing or promoting a drug for a use that the FDA has not approved. If the drug's labeling includes information about its unapproved uses, or does not contain adequate directions for use, it may be considered "misbranded". The courts have agreed with the FDA that the Food, Drug, and Cosmetic Act (FDCA) requires information not only on how a product is to be used (e.g., dosage and administration), but also on all the intended uses of the product. In 2004, whistleblower David Franklin prevailed in a suit under the False Claims Act against Warner-Lambert, resulting in a $430 million settlement in the Franklin v. Parke-Davis case. It was the first off-label promotion case successfully brought under the False Claims Act in U.S. history. Oral statements and materials presented at industry-support scientific and educational activities may provide evidence of a product's marketed use. If these statements or materials promote a use that is inconsistent with the product's approved labeling, the product is misbranded under the FDCA for failure to bear labeling with adequate directions for all intended uses.

=== Best price fraud ===
A drug's "Best Price" (BP) is a figure reported by the manufacturer to the Centers for Medicare & Medicaid Services (CMS) in quarterly reports under the Medicaid Rebate Program, and is used to calculate the Medicaid reimbursement rate. It is defined as the lowest price available to any wholesaler, retailer, provider, health maintenance organization (HMO), nonprofit entity, or the government. BP excludes prices to the Indian Health Service (IHS), Department of Veterans Affairs (DVA), Department of Defense (DOD), the Public Health Service (PHS), 340B covered entities, Federal Supply Schedule (FSS), state pharmaceutical assistance programs, depot prices, and nominal pricing. BP may include cash discounts and free goods that are contingent upon purchase, volume discounts, and rebates. The fraud occurs when the manufacturer falsely self-reports its Best Price.

=== Medicaid price reporting ===
In order to decrease the amounts owed to states under the Medicaid Drug Rebate Program, some companies misrepresent material facts regarding the regulatory origin, status, Average Manufacturer Price (AMP), and/or BP of their brand name drugs. Despite the Government's reliance on manufacturers' good faith in order to charge manufacturers a unit rebate amount based upon the manufacturer's own representation of drug status, and price, some manufacturers have deceptively and fraudulently breached their duty to deal honestly with the Government.

=== Manufactured compound drugs ===
FDA guidelines authorize pharmacists to "compound" or mix medications only in response to a physician's valid prescription. This assumes, of course, that the physician intends that the medication be compounded. The regulations further require that the mixed or compounded medications are medically necessary and not commercially available. Illegal compounding includes compounding of ingredients such that the compounded drug is tantamount to commercially available medications and mass manufacturing of drugs under the guise of compounding.

Federal law, including the CMS guidelines and the regulations of other Government Healthcare Programs, prohibit coverage of claims for "compounded" medications when the claims are submitted by a company that is mass manufacturing large amounts of unapproved drugs in violation of the Federal Food, Drug and Cosmetic Act (FFDCA), under the guise of "compounding."

=== Kickbacks ===
Kickbacks are rewards such as cash, jewelry, free vacations, corporate sponsored retreats, or other lavish gifts used to entice medical professionals into using specific medical services. These can vary from a small cash kickback for the use of an MRI when not required, to a lavish doctor/patient retreat that is funded by a pharmaceutical company to entice the prescription and use of a particular drug.

People engaging in this type of fraud are also subject to the federal Anti-Kickback statute.

== Examples of fraud cases ==
- $3 billion GSK settlement. On 2 July 2012, GlaxoSmithKline pleaded guilty to criminal charges and agreed to a $3 billion settlement, which was the largest payment by a drug company. The settlement is related to the company's illegal promotion of prescription drugs, its failure to report safety data, bribing doctors, and promoting medicines for uses for which they were not licensed. Paxil, Wellbutrin, Advair, Lamictal, and Zofran for promoted off-label, non-covered uses. Those, and the drugs Imitrex, Lotronex, Flovent, and Valtrex, were involved in the kickback scheme. The government investigation of GSK was launched largely on the basis of information provided by four whistleblowers who filed two qui tam (whistleblower) lawsuits against the company under the False Claims Act. GSK settled the whistleblowers' lawsuits for a total of $1.017 billion out of the $3 billion settlement, the largest civil False Claims Act settlement to date.
- Pfizer $2.3 billion settlement: In 2009, Pfizer settled multiple civil and criminal allegations for $2.3 billion in the largest case of pharmaceutical and health care fraud in US history. The case involved off-label marketing of and kickbacks for the prescription of Bextra (an anti-inflammatory drug), Geodon (an anti-psychotic drug), Lipitor (a cholesterol drug), Norvasc (an anti-hypertensive drug), Viagra (for erectile dysfunction), Zithromax (an antibiotic), Zyrtec (an antihistamine), Zyvox (an antibiotic), Lyrica (an anti-epileptic drug), Relpax (an anti-migraine drug), Celebrex (an anti-inflammatory drug), and Depo-provera (birth control).
- Merck $650 million settlement: Merck settled a nominal pricing fraud case in which the company was accused of taking kickbacks and violating Medicaid best price regulations for various drugs.
- United States et al., ex rel. Jim Conrad and Constance Conrad v. Forest Pharmaceuticals, Inc, et al. involved a drug manufacturer selling a drug, Levothroid, that had never been approved by the FDA. These allegations settled for $42.5 million due to multiple whistleblowers stepping forward to provide detailed information on the alleged fraud. The collective reward to the relators in this case was over $14.6 million.
- In response to a meningitis epidemic in Niger from February to May 1995 (41,000 cases reported), the Niger authorities organized an extensive vaccination campaign. In March 1995, Niger received a donation of 88,000 Pasteur Mérieux and SmithKline Beecham vaccines from neighboring Nigeria. A Médecins Sans Frontières (MSF) team working with local health authorities noticed that the vaccines from Nigeria had an unusual appearance and inquiries were made. Pasteur Mérieux laboratories confirmed that the batch numbers and the expiration dates did not correspond to their manufacturing records. The drugs supplied by these companies had been substituted with counterfeit drugs. Tests carried out found no traces of active product, which confirmed that they were false. Bottles and labels were, however, copied to perfection. According to estimates, around 60,000 persons were inoculated with false vaccines out of a total 5 million vaccinated during the campaign.

== See also ==
- Big Pharma (2006) by Jacky Law
- Bad Pharma (2012) by Ben Goldacre
- Drug fraud
- Health care fraud
- Lists about the pharmaceutical industry
- 2025 Counterfeit medication scandal

== External links and resources ==
1. Masterminds Behind Pharmaceutical Fraud Deserve Prison Time
2. Blowing the Whistle on Health Care Fraud
3. Health Care Fraud Prevention
