= List of drugs known for off-label use =

Pharmaceutical drugs become known for off-label use when publications begin discussing how they can be used for off-label treatment of medical conditions.

== List ==
- Actiq (oral transmucosal fentanyl citrate), a controlled substance, is used off-label to treat moderate to severe chronic, non-malignant pain even though it is approved in the United States solely for breakthrough pain in cancer patients.
- Bevacizumab (Avastin) has been used against wet age-related macular degeneration, as well as macular edema from diseases such as diabetic retinopathy and central retinal vein occlusion.
- Buprenorphine has been shown experimentally (1982–1995) to be effective against severe, refractory depression.
- Bupropion, when sold under the brand name Wellbutrin is indicated for depression. It is also sold as a smoking cessation drug, under the name Zyban. In Ontario, Canada, smoking cessation drugs are not covered by provincial drug plans. Thus, a physician can write a prescription for Wellbutrin to assist with giving up the habit of smoking. Sometimes it is also prescribed as second-line treatment of ADHD, often in combination with the stimulant being used, but it was also shown to work on its own as a norepinephrine–dopamine reuptake inhibitor. It is also given to counter the negative effects of SSRIs on libido, anorgasmia and anhedonia.
- Carbamazepine, or Tegretol, has been used as a mood stabilizer and is accepted treatment for bipolar disorder.
- Clomiphene (Clomid) for male infertility: clomiphene is approved for female infertility due to ovulatory disorder.
- Clonidine (Catapres) for ADHD: clonidine is approved and commonly used for the treatment of hypertension. Other off-label uses include cancer pain, hot sweats, certain psychiatric disorders, nicotine dependence, opioid withdrawal, migraine headaches, and restless leg syndrome.
- Colchicine (Colcrys) for pericarditis: colchicine is indicated for the treatment and prevention of gout, though it is also generally considered first-line treatment for acute pericarditis, as well as preventing recurrent episodes. Although the exact mechanism of colchicine is not fully understood, its anti-inflammatory effect for pericarditis appears to be related to its ability to inhibit microtubule self-assembly, resulting in decreased leucocyte motility and phagocytosis. Other non-FDA-approved uses include actinic keratosis, amyloidosis, Peyronie's disease, and psoriasis.
- Dexamethasone and betamethasone in premature labor, to enhance pulmonary maturation of the fetus.
- Doxepin has been used to treat angiodema and severe allergic reactions due to its strong antihistamine properties.
- Diphenhydramine, known in the US as Benadryl, is approved for treatment of allergies, but is also used off label for nausea, anxiety, and more.
- Gabapentin, approved for treatment of seizures and postherpetic neuralgia in adults, is used off-label for a variety of conditions including bipolar disorder, essential tremor, hot flashes, migraine prophylaxis, neuropathic pain syndromes, phantom limb syndrome, and restless leg syndrome.
- Lithium is approved by the FDA for the treatment of bipolar disorder and is widely prescribed off-label as a treatment for major depressive disorder, often as an augmentation agent. Lithium is recommended for the treatment of schizophrenic disorders only after other antipsychotics have failed; it has limited effectiveness when used alone.
- Magnesium sulfate is used in obstetrics for premature labor and preeclampsia.
- Memantine (Namenda) for OCD: memantine is approved for the treatment of Alzheimer's disease.
- Methotrexate (MTX), approved for the treatment of choriocarcinoma, is frequently used for the medical treatment of an unruptured ectopic pregnancy. There is no FDA-approved drug for this purpose and there is little incentive to sponsor an unpatented drug such as MTX for FDA-approval.
- Misoprostol is approved for medical abortion regimens when administered at the office, but clinicians often give abortion patients the drug to be taken at home.
- Modafinil is a central nervous system (CNS) stimulant medication used to treat sleepiness due to narcolepsy, shift work sleep disorder, and obstructive sleep apnea. It is often used off-label as a nootropic.
- Prazosin (Minipress) for nightmares: prazosin is approved for the use of hypertension. A 2012 systematic review showed a small benefit for the treatment of PTSD-associated night terrors. Other non-FDA-approved uses for prazosin include the treatment of Raynaud's disease and poisoning due to scorpion venom.
- Propranolol (Inderal) for performance anxiety: propranolol is a non-selective beta-blocker used for the treatment of hypertension and the prophylaxis of angina pectoris. In 1991, a published study showed that a single dose of propranolol immediately before the Scholastic Aptitude Test (SAT) significantly improved performance in high school students prone to cognitive dysfunction due to test anxiety. In addition to test taking, propranolol has been tested for public speaking, performing surgery, musical recitals, and sports, all with varying degrees of benefit. Other off-label uses for propranolol include the treatment of thyroid storm, portal hypertension, and neuroleptic-induced akathisia.
- Quetiapine (Seroquel) for insomnia: quetiapine is approved for the treatment of schizophrenia and bipolar disorder.
- Retigabine (INN) is an anticonvulsant used as an adjunctive treatment for partial epilepsies in treatment-experienced adult patients. Currently, it is being tested in the treatment of Tinnitus.
- The SSRI medication sertraline (Zoloft) is approved as an anti-depressant but is also commonly prescribed off-label to help men suffering from premature ejaculation.
- Tramadol, an opioid painkiller, is used to treat premature ejaculation, and may also be applied against restless legs syndrome.
- Low-dose naltrexone is cheap without side effects and used to treat cancer and autoimmune diseases like focal segmental glomerulosclerosis.
- Naltrexone (Revia) for behavioral addiction: there is some belief that low-dose naltrexone may benefit the treatment of cancer, HIV, and multiple sclerosis by “normalizing” the immune system; however, data is lacking. Naltrexone is approved for the treatment of alcohol and opioid dependence

== See also ==
- Lists of drugs
- List of off-label promotion pharmaceutical settlements
- Marketing of off-label use
