= Pill mill =

Illegal pain clinic

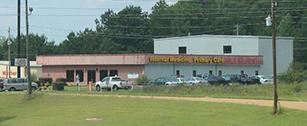
A pill mill in Jasper, Alabama, DEA photo from 2015

A pill mill is an illegal facility that resembles a regular pain clinic, but regularly prescribes painkillers (narcotics) without sufficient medical history, physical examination, diagnosis, medical monitoring, or documentation. Clients of these facilities usually receive prescriptions only against cash. Pill mills contribute to the opioid epidemic in the United States and are the subject of a number of legislative initiatives at the state level.

== Business model and characteristics ==
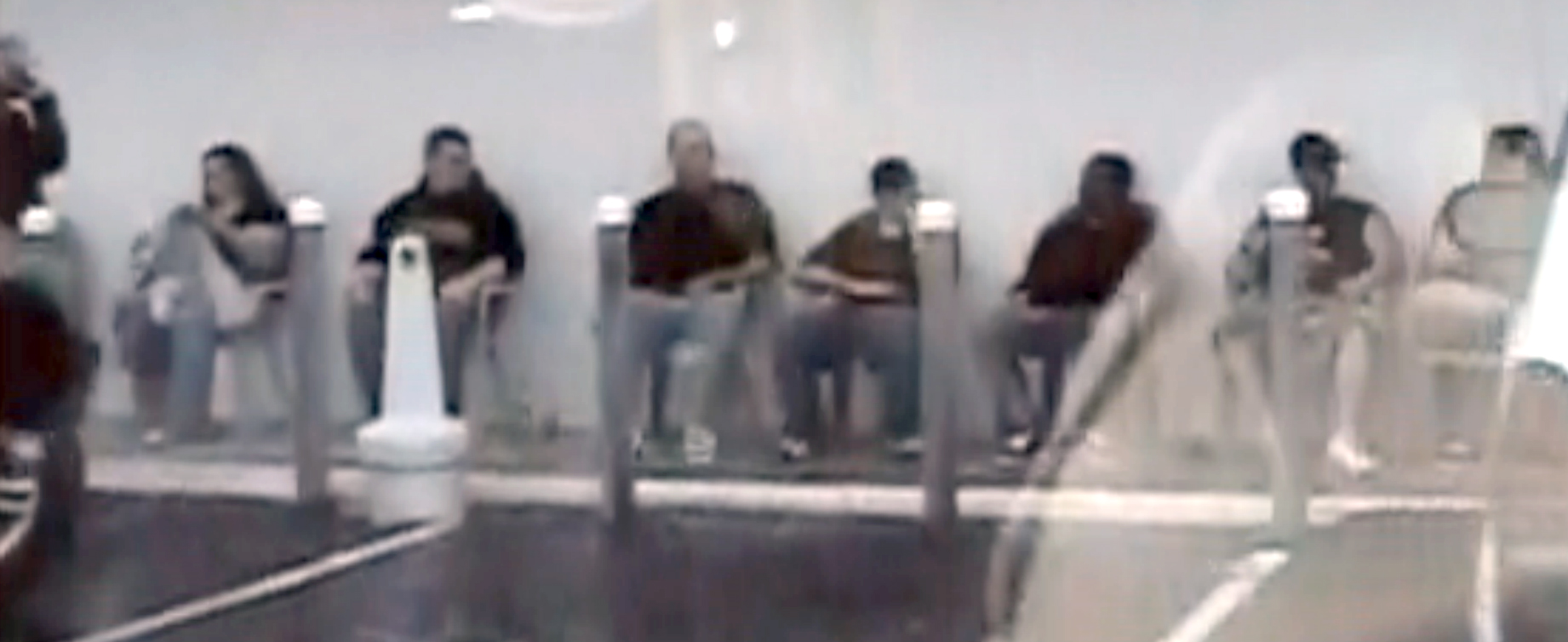
Customers at a pill mill in Florida, which was operated by Jeff and Chris George, wait on the sidewalk until it's their turn. Surveillance footage from the Palm Beach Sheriff's Office.

In pill mills, doctors or staff supervised by them prescribe opioids for non-existent or exaggerated pain. The primary purpose behind this prescribing practice is not to relieve pain or cure it, but to make high profits. This makes pill mills a criminal enterprise.

Characteristics of such facilities include that they are often owned by non-medical personnel and only cash is accepted (no credit cards or insurance payments). Medical records, findings, or X-rays are not required; medical examinations are not performed or are merely pro forma; alternatives to treatment with tablets are not discussed; strong painkillers are prescribed; and prescriptions can only be redeemed at certain pharmacies. Additionally, long queues are visible in front of the facilities, parking spaces in front of or near the facility are heavily frequented, and security personnel or doormen are used.

According to investigating authorities and scientists, such facilities come in different shapes and sizes, but for them it is important to give the impression that they are independent pain treatment centres. To avoid prosecution, pill mills' managers tend to run their facilities like pop-up stores. Clients of pill mills are addicted to medications or trade their medications to others.

== Origin and development ==
David Herbert Procter is considered the inventor of pill mills. The Canadian-born doctor established an office specializing in pain treatment in South Shore, Kentucky near Portsmouth, Ohio in 1979. In the mid-1980s, he was one of the first to prescribe painkillers that often contained opiates; he also combined them with benzodiazepines (tranquilizers) such as Xanax. His business expanded with the advent of OxyContin (active ingredient: Oxycodone), the blockbuster of the pharmaceutical company Purdue Pharma. He hired more doctors to run new practices. Some took over the business idea of the "godfather of pill mills" and later became self-employed.

Pill mills subsequently spread to other states, including for instance West Virginia, Texas, New Mexico, and New York. They gained great importance especially in Florida. There, the masterminds of the pill mills were Chris George and Jeff George who had a prominent position, which were the largest pill mills in the history of America.

== Consequences ==
Facilitated access to powerful painkillers is contributing to the opioid epidemic in the United States. Clients who take these drugs over a long period of time build up a tolerance to them and may need higher doses to achieve the same effect. Opioids have a euphoric effect, and are highly habit-forming, leading to dependency and addiction. Drug abuse leads to increasing numbers of cases in emergency rooms, cost-intensive treatment of addictions and frequent overdose deaths.

Excessive, negligent prescription of such drugs is a violation of medical ethics and laws. For this reason, a large number of police operations, measures by the Drug Enforcement Administration (DEA) and closures of these facilities have occurred. Many perpetrators were convicted by the courts, and by the end of 2016 there were 378 physicians in Florida alone, with 95 more under indictment there by that time.

In response to the growing problems with narcotics abuse, a number of states have tightened their laws. In Kentucky, for example, a law to improve monitoring of prescription practices, known as the Pill Mill Bill (KRS 218A.175 et seq.), has been in effect since 2012. By 2012, 41 U.S. states had implemented such prescription monitoring program, and by 2019 all states except Missouri had implemented such programs. There is debate in the literature about the extent to which the tightening of narcotics laws is causing people to turn to other opioids such as heroin, with some heroin users claiming that they have previously misused prescription opioids and switched to heroin because of its availability and cost. Opioid users have also turned to fentanyl, a highly potent opioid, which has contributed to many fatal overdoses due to both its potency and the unpredictability of street drugs.

== Adaptations ==
The OxyContin Express, a 2009 documentary by Portuguese journalist Mariana van Zeller, which follows the sales channels of pill mills in Florida, received further awards and nominations for the Emmy in addition to the Peabody Award (2010). The American television series American Greed, which has been dealing with white-collar crime since 2007, focused on pill mills in episodes 137 (first broadcast: March 2017) and 152 (first broadcast: March 2018). Money laundering for a pill mill plays an important role in the TV series Claws. The documentary The Pharmacist, released on Netflix in 2020, shows how Dan Schneider uncovered a pill mill in St. Bernard Parish, Louisiana through private investigations. Pill mills are featured in the 2021 miniseries Dopesick in its portrayal of the opioid crisis in appalachia.

== Literature ==
- Moreto, William D.; Gau, Jacinta M.; Brooke, Erika J. (April 2019). "Pill mills, occupational offending, and situational crime prevention: a framework for analyzing offender behavior and adaptation". Security Journal. 33 (2): 161–178. doi:10.1057/s41284-019-00180-y.
- Quinones, Sam (2015). Dreamland. The true tale of America's new opiate epidemic. New York, NY: Bloomsbury Press. ISBN 978-1-62040-250-4.
- Temple, John (2015). American Pain. How a Young Felon and His Ring of Doctors Unleashed America's Deadliest Drug Epidemic. Guilford, Connecticut: Lyons Press. ISBN 978-1-4930-0738-7.
- Rigg, Khary K.; March, Samantha J.; Inciardi, James A. (2010). "Prescription Drug Abuse & Diversion: Role of the Pain Clinic". J Drug Issues. 40 (3): 681–702. doi:10.1177/002204261004000307. PMC 3030470. PMID 21278927.

== See also ==
- Doctor shopping
- Substance abuse
- Drug diversion
- Opioid epidemic
- Timeline of the opioid epidemic
