= Marketing of off-label use =

Marketing of off-label use is advertising the use of drugs for purposes not approved by the regional government. The practice is often illegal and has led to most of the largest pharmaceutical settlements after Franklin v. Parke-Davis, in which a court ruled off-label marketing a violation of the False Claims Act.

== List of off-label promotion pharmaceutical settlements ==
Many of the conflicts among the list of largest pharmaceutical settlements were because of off-label promotion.

=== Franklin v. Parke-Davis ===
In 1993, the FDA approved gabapentin, marketed by Pfizer under the name "Neurontin", only for treatment of seizures. Pfizer subsidiary Warner-Lambert illegally used scientific activities, including continuing medical education and research, to commercially promote gabapentin, so that within five years the drug was being widely used for the off-label treatment of pain and psychiatric conditions—conditions that had not been approved by FDA. In 2004, Warner-Lambert admitted to charges that it violated FDA regulations by promoting the drug for these off-label uses: pain, psychiatric conditions, migraine, and other unapproved uses. The company paid $430 million to the federal government to settle the case.

== Marketing of off-label use ==
Access to pharmaceutical industry documents has revealed marketing strategies used to promote drugs for off-label use. The United States federal government is aggressively pursuing criminal and civil cases against pharmaceutical companies and their employees for promoting off-label uses of prescription drugs. Between 2003 and 2008, U.S. federal prosecutors and state attorneys general brought more than a dozen cases against drug manufacturers for off-label marketing and won more than $6 billion in criminal and civil settlements. In September 2009, Pfizer paid $1.3 billion, the largest criminal fine ever imposed in the United States, for the off-label marketing of Bextra and three other drugs. Pfizer paid an additional $1 billion in civil penalties resulting from the same illegal activities.

=== First Amendment issues ===
The FDA takes the position that a drug manufacturer may not promote its drug for an unapproved use, and that any such promotion is false and misleading simply because it is not FDA-approved. However, many off-label uses are in fact effective and safe, as is evidenced by subsequent FDA approval of such uses for numerous drug products. The Supreme Court has in recent years begun to address the boundaries between government regulation of pharmaceuticals and the First Amendment free speech guarantee. Some legal observers have suggested that the trend in the Court's decisions may ultimately reduce the ability of FDA to prevent broader dissemination of off-label information about approved drug products.

A three-judge panel of the United States Court of Appeals for the Second Circuit in Manhattan ruled on December 5, 2012, that a drug sales representative who was criminally prosecuted for making off-label promotional statements about Xyrem had suffered a violation of his First Amendment right to freedom of speech.
