= Qui tam =

Legal term in UK and US law

In common law, a writ of qui tam is a writ through which private individuals who assist a prosecution can receive for themselves all or part of the damages or financial penalties recovered by the government as a result of the prosecution. Its name is an abbreviation of the Latin phrase qui tam pro domino rege quam pro se ipso in hac parte sequitur, meaning "someone pursues in this matter for the lord king as well as for himself."

The writ fell into disuse in England and Wales following the Common Informers Act 1951 but remains current in the United States under the False Claims Act, 31 U.S.C. § 3729 et seq., which allows a private individual, or "whistleblower" (or relator), with knowledge of past or present fraud committed against the federal government to bring suit on its behalf. There are also qui tam provisions in 18 U.S.C. § 962 regarding arming vessels against friendly nations; 25 U.S.C. § 201 regarding violating Indian protection laws; 46 U.S.C. § 80103 regarding the removal of undersea treasure from the Florida coast to foreign nations; and 35 U.S.C. § 292 regarding false marking. In February 2011, the qui tam provision regarding false marking was held to be unconstitutional by a U.S. District Court, and in September of that year, the enactment of the Leahy–Smith America Invents Act effectively removed qui tam remedies from § 292.

== History ==
=== England and Wales ===
The historical antecedents of qui tam statutes lie in Roman and Anglo-Saxon law. Roman criminal prosecutions were typically initiated by private citizens (delatores) and beginning no later than the Lex Pedia, it became common for Roman criminal statutes to offer a portion of the defendant's forfeited property to the initiator of the prosecution as a reward. Forerunners of qui tam actions also occurred in Anglo-Saxon England; in the year 656, Wihtred of Kent issued a decree that a Sabbath-breaker would "forfeit his healsfang, and the man who informs against him shall have half the fine, and [the profits arising from] the labour."

The first qui tam statutes were enacted by the English Parliament in the fourteenth century, some 250 years after the Norman Conquest. Such qui tam enforcement allowed enforcement of the legislative priorities of the king, especially in areas where and at times when such legislation "undermined local officials' interests."

The 1318 Statute of York, which set uniform prices for certain consumer goods, was an early English qui tam provision. The act prohibited city and borough officers from selling the regulated commodities (specifically, "wine and victuals"), and provided for forfeiture to the king of any prohibited merchandise. To ensure enforcement, the act provided that one-third of the forfeited merchandise "shall be delivered to the Party that sued the Offender, as the King's Gift. And in such Case he that will sue [for a thing so forfeited,] shall be received."

More qui tam provisions were enacted over the next two centuries, rewarding informers. For example, the 1328 Statute of Northampton penalized (by forfeiture and fine) the holding of fairs by lords and merchants for longer than the authorized length, and provided that "every man that will sue for our Lord the King, shall be received, and [also have] the Fourth Part of that which shall be lost at his Suit." Two Statutes of Labourers, enacted in 1349 and 1350, set wage and price controls and provided for informers to seek forfeiture from the violator, or from mayors or bailiffs who failed to enforce the regulations. A large number of other statutes, mostly affecting commercial regulations, also included qui tam provisions.

Some qui tam statutes were targeted at ensuring the integrity of officials. For example:

In 1360, Parliament permitted informers to sue jurors who accepted bribes. Shortly thereafter, another law authorized qui tam suits if a person responsible for procuring and arranging for carriage of provisions for the King's household accepted a bribe. A 1391 statute permitted suits against mayors, sheriffs, and bailiffs who failed to implement a rule concerning measurement of grain. A 1442 statute prohibited customs officials and other public employees from engaging in businesses related to their public duties. The value of qui tam suits as a check on public officials had become so well accepted by 1444 that Parliament adopted no fewer than five such statutes in that single year.

During the reign of Henry VII, qui tam enforcement was reformed to avoid abuses, such as collusive suits between defendants and informers meant to avoid punishment. A 1487 statute, among other reforms, made it a crime (punishable by two years' imprisonment) to collude with a qui tam informer.

The practice fell into disrepute in England in the 19th century by which time it was principally used to enforce laws related to Christian Sunday observance. It was brought to an effective end by the Common Informers Act 1951 but, in 2007, there were proposals to introduce legal provision on the U.S. model back to the United Kingdom.

=== United States ===
"Whistleblower" can mean any person who reveals misconduct by his or her employer or another business or entity. The misconduct may be in the form of breaking the law, committing fraud, or corruption. In the United States, that type of fraud may violate the False Claims Act or similar state and local laws, and a whistleblower who exposes fraud on the government may bring a qui tam lawsuit on behalf of the government and potentially receive a share of the damages recovered by the government as a reward for bringing the action.

Whistleblower protections existed in the United States in colonial times, and were embraced by the first U.S. Congress as a way to enforce the laws when the new federal government had virtually no law enforcement officers.

The case of Richard Marven and Samuel Shaw led the Continental Congress to pass the first whistleblower law in the new United States in 1778. The Continental Congress was moved to act after an incident in 1777, when the two blew the whistle and suffered severe retaliation by Esek Hopkins, the commander-in-chief of the Continental Navy. The Continental Congress enacted the whistleblower protection law on July 30, 1778 by a unanimous vote. The Continental Congress declared it the duty of "all persons in the service of the United States, as well as all other the inhabitants thereof" to inform the Continental Congress or proper authorities of "misconduct, frauds or misdemeanors committed by any officers in the service of these states, which may come to their knowledge." Congress declared that the United States would defend the two whistleblowers against a libel suit filed against them by Hopkins, resolving that "the reasonable expences of defending the said suit be defrayed by the United States" and terminated the employment of Hopkins, who had misconducted himself.

==== False Claims Act ====
The American Civil War (1861–1865) was marked by fraud on all levels, especially with regard to Union War Department contracts. Some say the False Claims Act came about because of bad mules. During the Civil War, unscrupulous contractors sold the Union Army, among other things, decrepit horses and mules in ill health, faulty rifles and ammunition, and rancid rations and provisions.

The False Claims Act (31 U.S.C. §§ 3729–3733, also called the "Lincoln Law") is an American federal law that was passed on March 2, 1863 during the American Civil War, that allows people who are not affiliated with the government to file actions against federal contractors claiming fraud against the government. The law represented an effort by the government to respond to entrenched fraud in cases where the official Justice Department was reluctant to prosecute fraud cases. Importantly, a reward was offered in what is called the "qui tam" provision, which permits citizens to sue on behalf of the government and be paid a percentage of the recovery.

The law was substantially weakened in 1943 during World War II while the government rushed to sign large military procurement contracts. It was strengthened again in 1986 after a period of military expansion at a time when there were many stories of defense contractor price gouging. Since then, qui tam provisions have helped recover more than $48 billion in taxpayer money.

The act of filing such actions is informally called "whistleblowing." Persons filing under the Act stand to receive a portion (usually about 15%-25%) of any recovered damages. The Act provides a legal tool to counteract fraudulent billings turned in to the federal government. Claims under the law have been filed by persons with insider knowledge of false claims which have typically involved health care, military, or other government spending programs.

The False Claims Act allows a private person, known as a "relator," to bring a lawsuit on behalf of the United States, where the private detective or other person has information that the named defendant has knowingly submitted or caused the submission of false or fraudulent claims to the United States. In order to qualify as a "relator", pursuant to the Supreme Court's decision in Rockwell International Corp. v. United States, in order to bring an action that is based upon publicly disclosed information the person bringing the claim must legally qualify as an "original source."

The relator need not have been personally harmed by the defendant's conduct; instead, the relator is recognized as receiving legal standing to sue by way of a "partial assignment" to the relator of the injury to the government caused by the alleged fraud. The information must not be public knowledge, unless the relator qualifies as an "original source."

The False Claims Act provides incentive to relators by granting them between 15% and 25% of any award or settlement amount. In addition, the statute provides an award of the relator's attorneys' fees, making qui tam actions a popular topic for the plaintiff's bar. An individual bringing suit pro se — that is, without the representation of a lawyer — may not bring a qui tam action under the False Claims Act in some circuits.

Once a relator brings suit on behalf of the government, the Department of Justice, in conjunction with a U.S. Attorney for the district in which the suit was filed, have the option to intervene in the suit. If the government does intervene, it will notify the company or person being sued that a claim has been filed. Qui tam actions are filed under seal, which has to be partially lifted by the court to allow this type of disclosure. The seal prohibits the defendant from disclosing even the mere existence of the case to anyone, including its shareholders, a fact which may cause conflicts with the defendant's obligation under Securities and Exchange Commission or stock exchange regulations that require it to disclose lawsuits that could materially affect stock prices. The government may subsequently, without disclosing the identity of the plaintiff or any of the facts, begin taking discovery from the defendant.

If the government does not decide to participate in a qui tam action, the relator may proceed alone without the Department of Justice, though such cases historically have a much lower success rate. Relators who do prevail in such cases may potentially receive a higher relator's share, to a maximum of 30%. It is conventionally thought that the government chooses legal matters it would prosecute because the government would only want to get involved in what it believes are winning cases.

==== False patent marking ====
It is an offense under 35 U.S.C. § 292 (the "False Marking Statute") to falsely mark goods as "patented" or "patent pending". Before the enactment of the America Invents Act, any person could sue for breach, and the penalty of up to $500 was shared between the government and the person suing. Frequently, patentees fail to remove patent markings from their products following the expiration date of their patents and continue to mark goods sold after that date as patented. This behavior was largely overlooked until a court held that a separate penalty was due for each such article sold.

In 2011, the United States District Court for the Northern District of Ohio held that the False Marking Statute was unconstitutional. Judge Dan Aaron Polster determined that it violated the Take Care Clause of Article II of the Constitution, because it represented "a wholesale delegation of criminal law enforcement power to private entities with no control exercised by the Department of Justice".

The America Invents Act made significant changes to false marking laws, that affected all pending and future false marking actions:

- Only the U.S. government can now sue for the civil penalty authorized in § 292.
- Private entities can still sue, but only for compensatory damages. These plaintiffs must prove actual competitive injury from the false marking.
- It is no longer a violation to mark a product with an expired patent, as long as that patent once covered the product.

==== Defense Criminal Investigative Service ====
- From January 2006 to November 2011, Defense Criminal Investigative Service (DCIS) conducted 115 investigations involving qui tam matters. These qui tam investigations did not necessarily arise from reprisal complaints. Nonetheless, the person filing the complaint contributes to the mission of the Inspector General and is considered a whistleblower in the person's own right.
- In 2006, qui tam whistleblowers provided DCIS 102 information reports resulting in 57 regular investigations. In the following two years, 79 information reports resulted in 68 regular investigations and 71 information reports resulted in 43 regular investigations, respectively. In 2009 and 2010, 86 information reports generated 65 regular investigations and 108 information reports generated 73 regular investigations. At the close of 2011, DCIS had 82 information reports resulting in 56 regular investigations.

==== Examples ====
- In response to a complaint from whistleblower Jerry H. Brown II, the US Government filed suit against Maersk for overcharging for shipments to US forces fighting in Iraq and Afghanistan. In a settlement announced on 3 January 2012, the company agreed to pay $31.9 million in fines and interest, but made no admission of wrongdoing. Brown was entitled to $3.6 million of the settlement.
- Joe Faltaous worked as a Neuroscience Sales Specialist for Eli Lilly for two years before resigning after expressing concerns about Eli Lilly's practices. Joe complained of Lilly's illegal marketing, promotion and sale of Zyprexa to children and in higher-than-recommended dosages to adults. Joe also complained that, as part of the marketing and promotional schemes, Lilly encouraged physicians by means of monetary payments. In 2009, Faltaous and nine other whistleblowers won a settlement with Eli Lilly in a civil qui tam action in U.S. District Court.
- Delma Pallares, who rejected offers to be put in the witness protection program, worked for American Grocers as a logistics manager and general merchandise manager from 1996 through 2003. She gained extensive knowledge of the daily operations of American Grocers, including how the food products were invoiced, valued, and weighed prior to shipping and, according to the complaint, how the company and its employees changed expiration dates and forged accompanying documentation. Ms. Pallares's efforts in locating persuasive evidence led to this successful prosecution and enabled the U.S. Government to intervene.
- During her employment with ROTECH, Sheila Bell-Messier oversaw the operations of the company in twelve states. From 1995 to 2002, Bell's responsibility grew from overseeing twelve locations to 220 locations nationwide. During this time she was the number one profit maker in the country. Bell took over the Medicare billing because of her great track record and success with cost efficiency. Bell later determined, however, that a significant percentage of patient files were not in compliance because they lacked the correct documentation. Bell also discovered that there was improper testing of oxygen patients. Bell instructed her billing department to "shut down the billing." Compliance officers came to Texarkana. When they arrived, Bell told them the results of her audit. They informed Bell that they knew that they were significantly out of compliance. Bell told them that she "was not going to Medicare prison for ROTECH," and refused to restart the billing. Bell was told that ROTECH was in the middle of a settlement agreement with the Government and could not do anything that might put up a "red flag." ROTECH paid $2 million to settle civil charges that it engaged in false or fraudulent conduct in billing Medicare for durable medical equipment. The government declined intervention. This settlement netted the client and government about $1.78 million.
- On July 2, 2012 the British pharmaceutical company GlaxoSmithKline agreed to pay the U.S. government $3 billion to settle civil and criminal charges in the largest healthcare fraud settlement in U.S. history and the largest payment ever by a pharmaceutical company. The settlement also resolved four lawsuits pending in federal court in the District of Massachusetts four separate qui tam cases brought by whistleblowers under the False Claims Act. The civil charges were settled for $2 billion of the total $3 billion resolution, a record number for civil settlements brought under the False Claims Act. GSK pleaded guilty to promoting drugs for uses not approved by the FDA, also known as "off-label" marketing, and to failing to report key safety data regarding a product. Others charges in the suit include false price reporting practices, Medicaid fraud, and paying illegal kickbacks to physicians.
- In April 2012, Alliant Techsystems Inc. agreed to a $36,967,160 settlement to resolve allegations that ATK sold dangerous and defective illumination flares to the Army and the Air Force. According to the government's allegations, from 2000 to 2006, ATK delivered LUU-2 and LUU-19 illuminating para-flares to the Defense Department. These flares, which burn in excess of 3,000 degrees Fahrenheit for over five minutes, are used for nighttime combat, covert and search and rescue operations and have been used extensively by American forces in Iraq and Afghanistan. The government alleged that the flares delivered by ATK were incapable of withstanding a 10-foot drop test without exploding or igniting, as required by specifications, and that ATK was aware of this when it submitted claims for payment.
- In April 2012, AmMed Direct LLC agreed to pay the United States and the state of Tennessee $18 million plus interest to settle allegations that it submitted false claims to Medicare and Tennessee Medicaid. Both the United States and the state of Tennessee alleged that, from September 2008 through January 2010, the Antioch, Tenn.-based company submitted false claims to Medicare and TennCare for diabetes testing supplies, vacuum erection devices and heating pads. Prior to learning of the United States' and Tennessee's investigation, AmMed disclosed to the Medicare Administrative Contractors its failure to refund monies for returned supplies and began paying the refunds to Medicare and TennCare.
- In March 2012, LifeWatch Services Inc. agreed to pay the United States $18.5 million to resolve allegations that the company submitted false claims to federal health care programs. The settlement resolves two lawsuits filed under the whistleblower provisions of the False Claims Act. The two complaints allege that LifeWatch improperly billed Medicare for ambulatory cardiac telemetry (ACT) services. ACT services are a form of cardiac event monitoring that use cell phone technology to record cardiac events in real time without patient intervention. Traditional event monitoring requires the patient to press a button when he or she notices a cardiac event to record the cardiac rhythms. Medicare reimbursed ACT services at between $750 and $1200 and traditional event monitoring services at roughly $250 during the relevant time period.
- In November 2010, Special Agents from the Defense Criminal Investigative Service (DCIS) worked jointly with the U.S. Army Criminal Investigation Command, Major Procurement Fraud Unit on an investigation of Samir Itani. The Texas businessman agreed to pay $15 million to settle federal allegations that he and his company cheated the government by selling old and potentially dangerous food to the U.S. military to supply combat troops serving in Iraq and elsewhere. Prosecutors alleged that Samir Mahmoud Itani and his company American Grocers Ltd. profited from the Middle East conflict by defrauding taxpayers and shortchanging U.S. soldiers. According to the government, Itani's firm bought deeply discounted products whose freshness dates had expired or were nearing expiration, then altered those dates and resold those supplies to the government for hefty markups.
- In August 2009, the Justice Department announced The Boeing Company was ordered to pay the United States $25 million to resolve allegations that the company performed defective work on the entire KC-10 Extender fleet, today. The KC-10 Extender was a mainstay of the Air Force's aerial refueling fleet in the Iraq and Afghanistan war theaters. The lawsuit alleged that Boeing defectively installed insulation blanket kits in KC-10 aircraft while performing depot maintenance at the Boeing Aerospace Support Center in San Antonio, Texas.
- In September 2009, a former Pfizer Inc. sales representative, John Kopchinski, was awarded $51.5 million for his role as a whistleblower in the investigation of Pfizer's marketing practices of Bextra. Pfizer pleaded guilty to various civil and criminal charges and paid in total $2.3 billion to the government. The case netted the largest criminal fine ever imposed in the United States for any matter, $1.195 billion, and the largest civil fraud settlement against any pharmaceutical company. Qui tam "relators" are not eligible to receive shares of criminal fines. The $102 million that was distributed between the six whistleblowers was calculated from the fines paid in the civil settlement. Kopchinski's allegations were the basis for the majority of Pfizer's assessed civil fine, hence the size of his share relative to the other whistleblowers. Kopchinski and his attorneys filed the False Claims Act complaint in 2004 and alleged Pfizer systemically violated the federal Anti-Kickback statute, 42 U.S.C. § 1320a-7b(b) and the off-label marketing provision within the Federal Food, Drug, and Cosmetic Act ("FDCA"), 21 U.S.C. §§ 301-97. The qui tam provisions of the False Claims Act were triggered by the reimbursement for Bextra through Federal and State government programs, including but not limited to Medicare and Medicaid.
- A hospital group based in McAllen, Texas, has agreed to pay the United States $27.5 million to settle claims that it violated the False Claims Act, the Anti-Kickback Statute and the Stark Statute between 1999 and 2006, by paying illegal compensation to doctors in order to induce them to refer patients to hospitals within the group. McAllen Hospitals L.P., d/b/a/ South Texas Health System, is a subsidiary of Universal Health Services Inc., a company based in Pennsylvania that owns hospitals and other health care centers on the country.
- In April 2009, the medical lab company Quest Diagnostics agreed to pay a $302 million settlement, the largest ever paid by a medical lab company for a faulty product. A subsidiary of Quest, Nichols Institute Diagnostics Inc., was charged with marketing and selling faulty blood test kits to medical testing lab companies over a period of six years, despite substantial evidence that the product obtained inaccurate results. The "qui tam" case, which was brought under the False Claims Act by a California biochemist, launched a large-scale federal investigation and resulted in the record-setting resolution. The whistleblower was awarded $45 million of the $262 million civil settlement under the False Claims Act.
- In April 2009, the aerospace and defense technology company, Northrop Grumman, settled a lawsuit brought by a whistleblower and the US government alleging that the company sold faulty electronic equipment to the government for military satellites. The $325 million settlement remains the largest ever paid by a defense contractor in a qui tam case. Under the False Claims Act, which requires the government to award whistleblowers 15-25% of recoveries, the whistleblower Robert Ferro received $48.7 million for his participation in the case.
- In May 2004, Warner-Lambert agreed to settle claims brought in Franklin v. Parke-Davis by whistleblower David Franklin under the False Claims Act that the company had engaged in off-label promotion of the drug Neurontin. At the time, the $430 million settlement was one of the largest pharmaceutical settlements in history and the first off-label promotion case successfully brought under the False Claims Act.
- In October 2011, Pfizer agreed to settle all civil claims in a whistleblower suit brought under the False Claims Act in connection with off-label promotion of the drug Detrol. The settlement was $14,500,000.

=== Canada ===
In the provinces of Canada that observed the English common law, the qui tam action has had limited scope, although as recently as 1933 the Exchequer Court Act, R.S.C. 1927, c. 34 had language to the effect that qui tam was permitted in "suits for penalties or forfeiture as where the suit is on behalf of the Crown alone." (Bank of Montreal v. Royal Bank of Canada, [1933] SCR 311; see sec 75(a) of RSC 1886 v2 c.135 "Supreme and Exchequer Courts"). Lawyers have used the qui tam action to prevent unwarranted intrusion into their domain by unqualified practitioners (1871: Allen Qui Tam v. Jarvis, 32 UCR 56). In cases like these, it would appear that the Crown is owed a bond from qualified practitioners, and the respondents — since they have not provided such a bond — are penalised by the courts. Allen in this case would seem to gain a fraction of the penalty exacted from Jarvis, the balance to the Crown.

== Whistleblowers ==
"Whistleblower" can mean any person who reveals misconduct by his or her employer or another business or entity. The misconduct may be in the form of breaking the law, committing fraud, or corruption. In the United States, that type of fraud may be a violation of the False Claims Act, or similar state and local laws, and a whistleblower who exposes fraud on the government may bring a qui tam lawsuit on behalf of the government and potentially receive a share of the recovery recovered by the government as a reward for bringing that action.

In order for a whistleblower (also known as a "relator" in the context of the FCA) to bring a qui tam action that is based upon publicly disclosed information, that person must legally qualify as an "original source." See Rockwell International Corp. v. United States.

== See also ==
- Private attorney general
- Parens patriae
- Common Informers Act 1951
- False Claims Act

== Bibliography ==
- For a history of qui tam actions, see "Vermont Agency of Natural Resources v. United States ex. rel. Stevens (98-1828) 529 U.S. 765 (2000)". Supreme Court collection. Cornell University Law School.
