= Cefsulodin =

Chemical compound

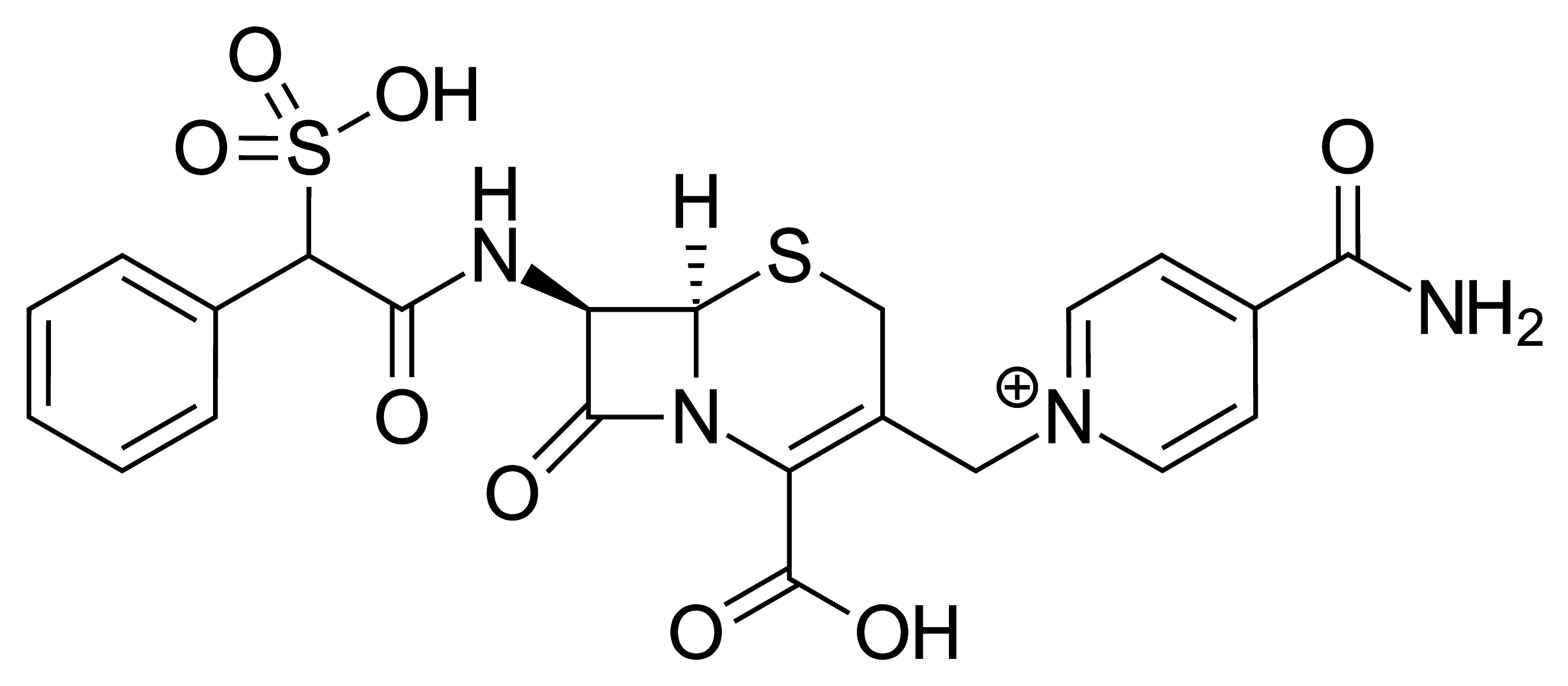

Clinical data
- AHFS/Drugs.com: International Drug Names
- ATC code: J01DD03 (WHO)

Identifiers
- IUPAC name: 4-(aminocarbonyl)-1-[((6R,7R)-2-carboxy-8-oxo-7-{[phenyl(sulfo)acetyl]amino}-5-thia-1-azabicyclo[4.2.0]oct-2-en-3-yl)methyl]pyridinium
- CAS Number: 62587-73-9; Sodium salt: 52152-93-9
- PubChem CID: 5284530
- ChemSpider: 4447588
- UNII: OV42LHE42B; Sodium salt: 2D087186PY
- KEGG: D02005
- ChEMBL: ChEMBL1617285
- CompTox Dashboard (EPA): DTXSID6022769

Chemical and physical data
- Formula: C_{22}H_{21}N_{4}O_{8}S_{2}^{+}
- Molar mass: 533.55 g·mol^{−1}
- 3D model (JSmol): Interactive image
- SMILES: O=C2N1/C(=C(\CS[C@@H]1[C@@H]2NC(=O)C(c3ccccc3)S(=O)(=O)O)C[n+]4ccc(C(=O)N)cc4)C([O-])=O
- InChI: InChI=1S/C22H20N4O8S2/c23-18(27)13-6-8-25(9-7-13)10-14-11-35-21-15(20(29)26(21)16(14)22(30)31)24-19(28)17(36(32,33)34)12-4-2-1-3-5-12/h1-9,15,17,21H,10-11H2,(H4-,23,24,27,28,30,31,32,33,34)/t15-,17?,21-/m1/s1; Key:SYLKGLMBLAAGSC-IKZMBGHXSA-N

Cefsulodin is a third-generation cephalosporin antibiotic that is active against Pseudomonas aeruginosa and was discovered by Takeda Pharmaceutical Company in 1977.

TAP Pharmaceuticals had a new drug application on file with FDA for cefsulodin under the brand name Cefonomil as of 1985.

Cefsulodin is most commonly used in cefsulodin-irgasan-novobiocin agar to select for Yersinia microorganisms. This agar is most often used in water and beverage testing.

== Susceptibility data ==
The following represents MIC susceptibility data for various P. aeruginosa strains:

- Pseudomonas aeruginosa PA13 (resistant strain): 32 μg/ml
- Pseudomonas aeruginosa (wild-type, susceptible): 4 - 8 μg/ml
