= Christopher Paul George =

American convicted drug dealer (b. 1980)

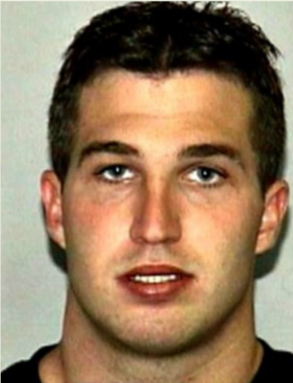
Mug shot of Chris George

Christopher Paul George, called Chris George (born November 11, 1980, in the United States) is an American drug dealer. Together with his twin brother Jeffrey Frank George (Jeff George) and other parties involved, he ran several pill mills in Florida, which contributed to the opioid epidemic in the USA. George was sentenced to 17.5 years imprisonment in 2012 for these and other crimes. The media called him Pill Mill Kingpin, because he was the owner of the largest network of such clinics in Florida between February 2008 and March 2010.

== Origin, family, adolescence ==
The twin brothers Chris and Jeff grew up as children of John George and his wife Denice Haggerty in Wellington, Florida, an area where the inhabitants are considered to be wealthy. The father had become rich in the construction sector. Their parents divorced in 1988. According to their father, Chris and Jeff were not particularly good students, but they acquired entrepreneurial attitudes in the parental home.

Chris was first arrested at the age of 13. Further conflicts with the police followed due to illegal possession of alcohol, brawls, contraventions, obstruction of justice and theft. In 2003 he was arrested for ordering and accepting a package of anabolic steroids for his own use and for friends. Chris George was sentenced to eight months in prison, six of which he served in work furlough, mainly as an employee of his father's business. After being released from prison, he continued working in his father's construction company. Previously, Chris had studied business administration and construction management without earning a degree, spending two years at Palm Beach Community College and two years at Florida International University.

== First sales activities ==
Before entering the pill mill business, Chris George and his twin brother Jeff ran the South Beach Rejuvenation Clinic, a company that sold anabolic steroids illegally. After telemedical consultations by telephone or e-mail, bodybuilding products were distributed. Jeff George was registered as the owner of this business, which was established around 2006.

== Pill mills ==
=== South Florida Pain Clinic ===
After talks with a doctor, Chris George decided at the end of 2007 to enter the pain management business together with his twin brother. He pushed ahead with the corresponding planning and preparations so that the South Florida Pain Clinic could start in February 2008. Its first location was a bungalow on Oakland Park Boulevard, in Fort Lauderdale, Florida.

Within two weeks, Chris George recognized the opportunities in the pill mill business and began the expansion. He placed job offers for doctors on craiglist.org. A few weeks after the business started, a large number of Kentucky and Tennessee-based customers visited the South Florida Pain Clinic. The revenues increased significantly, partly because of so-called sponsors, who paid a handful of people, often opioid addicts, to come to the South Florida Pain Clinic, receive prescriptions for high-dose painkillers, and purchase hundreds of them at the clinic. Some of these pills were given by the patients or buyers to the sponsors, who then sold them on the black market.

Advertising on large billboards, in free newspapers and on the Internet contributed to the business success. Chris George also hired experts to optimize search engine rankings for the South Florida Pain Clinic website. At the same time, he took care of building up a stable network of suppliers, mostly smaller pain drug wholesalers.

Complaints from owners of surrounding businesses led to the publication of a newspaper report about the South Florida Pain Clinic. Subsequently, the police observed the area. The clinic responded to these circumstances and the rapidly growing number of clients by moving to a new location, Cypress Creek Executive Court, an office complex near Fort Lauderdale Executive Airport, in summer 2008. At this location the number of personnel was increased. After a few weeks, complaints from residents also increased, resulting in the South Florida Pain Clinic receiving scrutiny from media law enforcement agencies, and the landlord terminated the lease.

=== American Pain ===
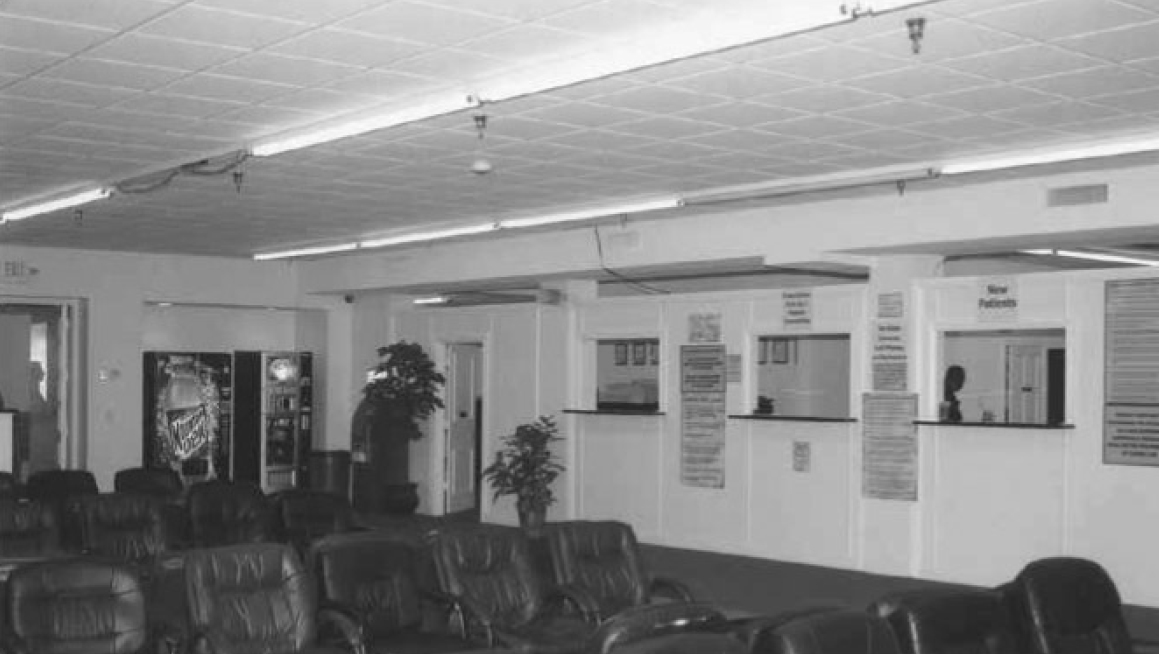
The waiting room of American Pain on North Dixie Highway in Lake Worth from a March 3, 2010 FBI photo

For these reasons, business continued in 2009 on the North Federal Highway in Boca Raton. The move was accompanied by a change of name, the company now was called American Pain. In the official documents Chris George was no longer registered as owner, but a straw man.

Business continued to flourish. In the second half of 2009, five full-time physicians were working there, with additional physicians on part-time jobs; the number of staff was around 20. At the same time, internal processes were optimized so that as many patients as possible could be supplied with painkillers in the shortest possible time. The clinic developed more and more into a "prescription assembly line".

Despite the change of name, it was not possible to escape media attention and official observation. For example, the team of Portuguese journalist Mariana van Zeller filmed the clinic. These shots, and those of a subsequent pursuit of the journalist by Chris George and American Pain's head of security, were used in Zeller's documentary The OxyContin Express, which received further awards and Emmy nominations in addition to the Peabody Award (2010).

The search for a new location for American Pain began in November 2009 and Chris George decided to move to a former bank building on the North Dixie Highway in Lake Worth. It had three floors and more than 6,000 square meters, twice the size of the previous building on the North Federal Highway and almost twenty times the size of the bungalow on Oakland Park Boulevard. Operations began there on February 1, 2010.

=== Other companies ===
In 2009, Chris George opened another, much smaller clinic, Executive Pain, in West Palm Beach. His partner and later wife was Dianna Marie Pavnick, a former stripper. In the same year he acquired a pharmacy (Quick Pharm) in Orlando, Florida, which was subsequently also run by a straw man. Another pharmacy whose ownership Chris George concealed was Boca Drugs in Boca Raton.

In February 2010, the twin brothers opened a small pill mill in Kennesaw, Georgia, as a precautionary measure in the event of stricter Florida legislation on the prescription and sale of prescription painkillers.

=== Numbers and significance ===
Doctors usually prescribed a mix of painkillers, including large amounts of Oxycodone, Xanax, and Soma. In the American Pain location alone, doctors treated up to 500 patients daily. From July 7, 2008, to about March 2, 2010, doctors at this clinic wrote approximately 66,871 prescriptions, 96 percent for oxycodone or alprazolam. About 80 percent of the prescriptions of this location went to people who were not resident in Florida.

In August 2011, an FBI representative described the group of companies as the largest criminal organization in the USA dealing with the illegal distribution of painkillers.

George stated that his pill mills made more than forty million dollars.

== Observations, criminal proceedings, judgments ==
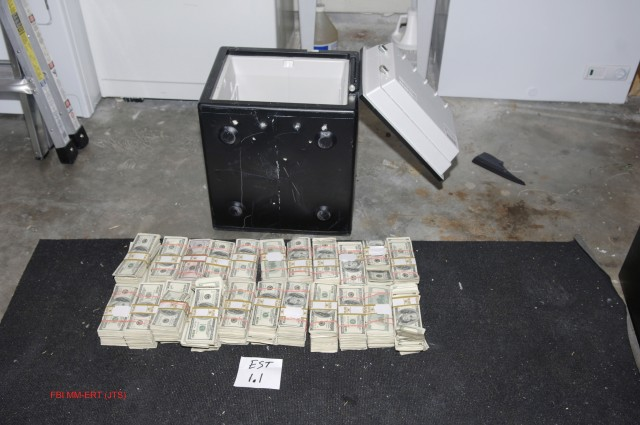
One of four safes with money totalling $4.3 million found in the attic of Chris George's mother in a March 2010 FBI photo

For approximately 14 months, the FBI, DEA, the Internal Revenue Service, Palm Beach County Sheriff's Office and other law enforcement agencies evaluated information about the corporate group in covert Operation Oxy Alley before searching clinics and private homes and securing extensive evidence on March 3, 2010.

Among the confiscated goods owned by George were three large real estates, several luxury cars and motorboats. In the attic of Chris George's mother's home, $4.3 million in cash was found, stored in several safes.

The 123-page indictment dated August 11, 2011, was directed against George, his twin brother Jeff, Dianna Pavnick George, Denice Haggerty, 13 physicians, and 15 other individuals involved. In order to prove the cooperation of the defendants and the role of the doctors, the indictment was based, among other things, on the RICO act, a federal law passed in 1970, in particular to combat the American mafia. The charges were organized crime, conspiracy, money laundering, kidnapping, extortion, illegal distribution of drugs subject to special surveillance, maintenance of premises associated with drugs, and conspiracy to commit fraud in the Internet and mail order business.

Many of the accused pleaded guilty and were sentenced to prison. On February 10, 2012, George's wife, Dianna Pavnick, and the twin's mother, Denice Haggerty, were both sentenced to four and a half years, having been the manager and assistant manager, respectively, at one of the pill mill clinics. On February 12, 2012, George was sentenced to seventeen and a half years. In April 2014, it was reduced to 14 years because George was cooperating with the authorities in the trial of two of his former doctors who were accused of murder. In December 2015, twin Jeff George was sentenced to 20 years in prison for a drug overdose murder, in addition to the same crimes for which Chris was sentenced.

On February 11, 2022, George was released from federal prison.

On July 9, 2024, Jeff George was released from federal prison and transferred to Florida State Prison. He was released early from state prison on May 2, 2025, after a successful appeal of his second degree murder and trafficking cases.

== Adaptations ==
In addition to the contemporary coverage in newspapers and television stations, the criminal activities of the George twins were also taken up in other formats. The TV series Evil Twins described the twin brothers' behavior in the episode The Candymen, which was broadcast in 2015. The CNBC series American Greed made the pill mills of the George twins the subject of the episode Pain Killer Profits in June 2016. History produced Legal Pill Mills Ushered America's Opium Crisis, which deals with the George twins' ventures. John Temple published his book American Pain in 2015, which traces the rise and fall of George's Pill Mills. Warner Bros. acquired the film rights to Temple's work in 2014, and in September 2019 it was announced that a new production company - Faster Horse Pictures - was planning to make the film.

== Annex ==
=== Literature ===
- John Temple: American Pain. How a Young Felon and His Ring of Doctors Unleashed America's Deadliest Drug Epidemic. Lyons Press, Guilford (Connecticut) 2015, ISBN 978-1-4930-1959-5.

=== External links ===
- Felix Gillette: American Pain: The Largest U.S. Pill Mill's Rise and Fall. In: Bloomberg News, 6. Juni 2012.
- Thomas Francis: How Florida brothers' 'pill mill' operation fueled painkiller abuse epidemic. In: MSNBC, 7. Mai 2012.
- United States Of America v. Christopher Paul George, Jeffrey George (...) (Indictment), 11. August 2011.
