= TAP Pharmaceuticals =

Japanese-American pharmaceutical joint venture

TAP Pharmaceuticals Inc.
- Company type: Joint venture
- Industry: Pharmaceuticals
- Founded: 1977
- Defunct: 2008
- Fate: Dissolved
- Headquarters: Deerfield, Illinois, U.S. Nihonbashi, Chuo, Tokyo, Japan
- Parent: Takeda Pharmaceutical Company; Abbott Laboratories

TAP Pharmaceuticals was formed in 1977 as a joint venture between the two global pharmaceutical companies, Abbott Laboratories and Takeda Pharmaceutical Co. and was dissolved in 2008; its two most lucrative products were proton-pump inhibitor lansoprazole (Prevacid) and the prostate cancer drug, leuprorelin (Lupron). The intention of the joint venture was to get products that Takeda had discovered developed, approved, and marketed in the US and Canada.

The company was established at a time when Japanese pharmaceutical companies were seeking partnerships to access the US market. These efforts were supported by the Japanese government at the time to help the national economy compete in higher technology, as countries like South Korea, Taiwan were beginning to catch up with Japan in commodity production. Japanese pharmaceutical companies were especially strong in the fields of generating analogs of known cephalosporin antibiotics, cancer drugs, and cardiovascular drugs.

The first products TAP file new drug applications for, were two cephalosporins, cefmenoxime (Cefmax) and cefsulodin (Cefonomil), estazolam for sleep disorders, and leuprorelin; leuprorelin was the first one approved, in 1985.

In 1998 Takeda established its own US R&D and sales force, for the diabetes drug pioglitazone (Actos).

In 2000, TAP's withdrew its new drug application for apomorphine (branded as "Uprima") as a treatment for erectile dysfunction after an FDA review panel raised questions about the drug's safety, due to many clinical trial subjects fainting after taking the drug.

In 2001, the US Department of Justice, states attorneys general, and TAP Pharmaceutical Products settled criminal and civil charges against TAP related to federal and state medicare fraud and illegal marketing of the drug leuprorelin. TAP paid a total of $875 million, which was a record high at the time.

The $875 million settlement broke down to $290 million for violating the Prescription Drug Marketing Act, $559.5 million to settle federal fraud charges for overcharging Medicare, and $25.5 million reimbursement to 50 states and Washington, D.C., for filing false claims with the states' Medicaid programs. The case arose under the False Claims Act with claims filed by Douglas Durand, a former TAP vice president of sales, and Joseph Gerstein, a doctor at Tufts University's HMO practice. Durand, Gerstein, and Tufts shared $95 million of the settlement.

When the settlement was announced, the Department of Justice also announced that seven people were indicted on criminal charges by a grand jury; the DoJ also said that four doctors pleaded guilty for receiving kickbacks. As of 2003 around 12 TAP employees had been indicted and were contested the charges, and one pleaded guilty. However, in July 2004 a federal jury in Boston declared all the defendants not guilty.

Abbott and Takeda agreed to end the partnership in 2008, with Abbott keeping the rights to leuprorelin, which had sales in 2007 of $600 million and a patent expiring in 2015 and the approximately 300 employees who worked on the product, and Takeda keeping the rights to lansoprazole, which had sales of $2.3 billion in 2007 but was facing imminent generic competition, along with 800 employees in the U.S. and all the drugs in the TAP pipeline. Takeda was also obligated to pay Abbott about $1.5 billion over several years. By 2008, Takeda's own sales in the US outside of TAP had grown to $3 billion, mostly from sales of pioglitazone which by then was the best-selling diabetes drug in the world.
