= Off-label use =

Use of pharmaceuticals for conditions different from that for which they were approved

Off-label use is the use of pharmaceutical drugs for an unapproved indication or in an unapproved age group, dosage, or route of administration. Both prescription drugs and over-the-counter drugs (OTCs) can be used in off-label ways, although most studies of off-label use focus on prescription drugs.

Off-label use is very common and generally legal unless it violates ethical guidelines or safety regulations. The ability to prescribe drugs for uses beyond the officially approved indications is commonly used to good effect by healthcare providers. For example, methotrexate is commonly used off-label because its immunomodulatory effects relieve various disorders. However, off-label use can entail health risks and differences in legal liability. Marketing of pharmaceuticals for off-label use is usually prohibited.

== Indications and labeling laws ==
An indication is when a drug is medically appropriate for a given condition; an approved indication is when a government drug regulatory agency formally agrees that the drug is medically appropriate for the named condition. Indications may depend not only upon the medical condition that is being treated, but also upon other factors, such as dose, the patient's age, size and sex, whether the patient is pregnant or breastfeeding, and other medical conditions. For example, aspirin is generally indicated for a headache, but it is not indicated for headaches in people with an allergic reaction to it.

When the drug's manufacturer has received a marketing authorisation from the government agency, then it is allowed to promote the drug for the specific, agreed-upon approved indications in that country. All legally approved indications are listed on the drug package insert or "label". Drug manufacturers are not legally permitted to encourage the use of regulated drugs for any indications that have not been formally approved by the country's government, even if significant scientific evidence exists for that unapproved indication, or if another country's drug agency has approved that indication.

However, healthcare providers are not required to limit prescriptions or recommendations to the indications approved by their country's drug regulatory body. In fact, the standard of care for many conditions involves off-label uses, either as first-line therapy or as a subsequent line. In other words, properly understanding why off-label use is common and usually appropriate, rather than rare and usually inappropriate, requires understanding that the distinction between regulatory-agency-approved use versus off-label use is not the same distinction as safe versus unsafe, tested versus untested, or good versus bad; it is a marker of increased certainty about a use being good (safe and effective), as opposed to less certainty—rather than a marker of good as opposed to bad. Regulatory approval for an indication requires a body of evidence that costs money to assemble, and as with evidence-based medicine generally, the desire for a vast, high-quality evidence base is an ideal that real-world practice can only aspire to and further approach, rather than completely match; there may not be enough resources to test every drug for every possible or logical indication to an exhaustive degree. Regulation of therapy freedom thus takes an approach in which anything not explicitly forbidden is allowed rather than an approach in which anything not explicitly allowed is forbidden, and it is accepted that drugs may be used in off-label ways as long as a competent professional prescribes them.

== Frequency of off-label use ==
Off-label use is very common. Generic drugs generally have no sponsor as their indications and use expands, and incentives are limited to initiate new clinical trials to generate additional data for approval agencies to expand indications of proprietary drugs. Up to one-fifth of all drugs are prescribed off-label and amongst psychiatric drugs, off-label use rises to 31%.

Among use of antipsychotic medications in the United States, a shift occurred from typical agents in 1995 (84% of all antipsychotic visits) to atypical agents by 2008 (93%). Atypical use has grown far beyond substitution for the now infrequently used typical agents.

A 2009 study found that 62% of U.S. pediatric office visits from 2001 to 2004 included off-label prescribing, with younger children having a higher chance of receiving off-label prescriptions. Specialist physicians also prescribed off-label more frequently than general pediatricians. In 2003, passage of the Pediatric Research Equity Act gave the FDA power to require pharmaceutical companies to perform clinical trials in all age groups in which clinical use is reasonably foreseeable. By some estimates, the number of clinical trials performed in children from 2002 to 2012 exceeded that in the prior 50 years.

In 2014, the American Academy of Pediatrics released a statement regarding off-label use of pharmaceuticals in children. The article recommends to pediatricians that "Off-label use is neither incorrect nor investigational if based on sound scientific evidence, expert medical judgment, or published literature" and that "Evidence, not label indication, remains the gold standard from which practitioners should draw when making therapeutic decisions for their patients." The statement further advocates additional support and additional incentives for clinical testing of drugs in children, and publication of all results irrespective of positive outcome.

A study published in 2006 found that off-label use was the most common in anticonvulsants. The study also found that 73% of off-label use had little or no scientific support.

By default, use of non-approved drugs is common in obstetrics. By 2010, during almost five decades of activity, the Food and Drug Administration (FDA) had approved only two drugs for obstetrical indications, namely oxytocin and dinoprostone. A small market and the high risk of medicolegal action, as exemplified by the Bendectin case, may explain the reluctance to develop drugs for approval.

Some drugs are used more frequently off-label than for their original, approved indications. A 1991 study by the U.S. General Accounting Office found that one-third of all drug administrations to cancer patients were off-label, and more than half of cancer patients received at least one drug for an off-label indication. A 1997 survey of 200 cancer physicians by the American Enterprise Institute and the American Cancer Society found that 60% of them prescribed drugs off-label. In some cases, patients may perceive the efficacy of treatments for off-label purposes to be higher than for their indicated purpose. Frequently, the standard of care for a particular type or stage of cancer involves the off-label use of one or more drugs. An example is the use of tricyclic antidepressants to treat neuropathic pain. This old class of antidepressants is now rarely used for clinical depression due to side effects, but the tricyclics are often effective for treating pain (e.g. neuropathy), as well as attention deficit/hyperactivity disorder (ADHD) particularly in adults.

== Society and culture ==
Drug manufacturers market drugs for off-label use in a range of ways. Marketing practices around off-label use have caused various of lawsuits and settlements about inappropriately promoting drugs. Some of those lawsuits have ended granting the largest pharmaceutical settlements in the world.

In the United States in 2017, the government is considering allowing direct-to-consumer advertising to promote off-label drug use. The appointment of Scott Gottlieb to become head of the United States Food and Drug Administration (FDA) furthered discussion, as this person advocates to allow that sort of promotion.

=== Regulation in the United States ===
In the United States, once a drug has been approved for sale for one purpose, physicians are free to prescribe it for any other purpose that in their professional judgment is both safe and effective, and are not limited to official, FDA-approved indications. Pharmaceutical companies are not allowed to promote a drug for any other purpose without formal FDA approval. Marketing information for the drug will list one or more indications, that is, illnesses or medical conditions for which the drug has been shown to be both safe and effective.

This off-label prescribing is most commonly done with older, generic medications that have found new uses but have not had the formal (and often costly) applications and studies required by the FDA to formally approve the drug for these new indications. However, there is often extensive medical literature to support the off-label use.

A leading example of how regulatory agencies approach off-label use is provided by the FDA's Center for Drug Evaluation and Research, which reviews a company's New Drug Application (NDA) for clinical trial data to see if the results support the drug for a specific use or indication. If satisfied that the drug is safe and effective, the drug's manufacturer and the FDA agree on specific language describing dosage, route of administration, and other information to be included on the drug's label. More detail is included in the drug's package insert.

The FDA approves a drug for prescription use, and continues to regulate the pharmaceutical industry's promotional practices for that drug through the work of the Office of Prescription Drug Promotion (OPDP, formerly the Division for Drug Marketing, Advertisement and Communication (DDMAC). The FDA does not have the legal authority to regulate the practice of the medicine, and the physician may prescribe a drug off-label. Contrary to popular notion, it is legal in the United States and in many other countries to use drugs off-label, including controlled substances such as opiates. Actiq, for example, is commonly prescribed off-label even though it is a Schedule II controlled substance. While it would be legal for a physician to independently decide to prescribe a drug such as Actiq off-label, it is illegal for the company to promote off-label uses to prescribers. In fact, Cephalon, the maker of Actiq, was fined for illegal promotion of the drug in September 2008. Under the Food, Drug, and Cosmetic Act (FDCA) at U.S.C. 21 §§301-97, manufacturers are prohibited from directly marketing a drug for a use other than the FDA-approved indication. However, in December 2012, the United States Second Circuit Court found that promotion of off-label uses by a company sales representative was considered to be protected speech per the First Amendment. In addition, the Food and Drug Administration Modernization Act of 1997 created an exception to the prohibition of off-label marketing, allowing manufacturers to provide medical practitioners with publications on off-label uses of a drug, in response to an unsolicited request. In 2004, the federal government and whistleblower David Franklin reached a $430 million settlement in Franklin v. Parke-Davis to resolve claims that Warner-Lambert engaged in off-label promotion of Neurontin in violation of the FDCA and the False Claims Act. At the time, the settlement was one of the largest recoveries against a pharmaceutical company in U.S. history, and the first off-label promotion settlement in U.S. history.

Litigation around the marketing of ethyl eicosapentaenoic acid (E-EPA, branded as "Vascepa") by Amarin Corporation led to a 2015 court decision that has changed the FDA's approach to off-label marketing. E-EPA was the second fish oil drug to be approved, after omega−3-acid ethyl esters (GlaxoSmithKline's Lovaza which was approved in 2004) and sales were not as robust at Amarin had hoped. The labels for the two drugs were similar, but doctors prescribed Lovaza for people who had triglycerides lower than 500 mg/dL based on some clinical evidence. Amarin wanted to actively market E-EPA for that population as well which would have greatly expanded its revenue, and applied to the FDA for permission to do so in 2013, which the FDA denied. In response, in May 2015 Amarin sued the FDA for infringing its First Amendment rights, and in August 2015 a judge ruled that the FDA could not "prohibit the truthful promotion of a drug for unapproved uses because doing so would violate the protection of free speech". The ruling left open the question of what the FDA would allow Amarin to say about E-EPA, and in March 2016 the FDA and Amarin agreed that Amarin would submit specific marketing material to the FDA for the FDA to review, and if the parties disagreed on whether the material was truthful, they would seek a judge to mediate.

=== Regulation in the United Kingdom ===
Physicians in the United Kingdom can prescribe medications off-label. According to General Medical Council guidance, the physician must be satisfied that there is sufficient evidence or experience of using the medicine to demonstrate safety and efficacy. Prescribing may be necessary when no suitably licensed medicine is available to meet the patient's need (or when the prescribing is part of approved research).

=== Regulation in Mainland China ===
On 20 August 2021, the Standing Committee of the 13th National People's Congress of the People's Republic of China adopted the Medical Practitioners Law, which explicitly permitted off-label use under certain circumstances. Prior to its adoption, there was no specific legislation regarding off-label use in China, and the practice existed in a legal grey area.

== Veterinary medicines ==
The veterinarian has a much smaller pharmacopeia available than does the human practitioner. Therefore, drugs are more likely to be used "off-label" – typically, this involves the use of a human medication in an animal, where there is no corresponding medication licensed for that species. This problem is compounded in "exotic" species (such as reptiles and rodents) where there are very few, if any licensed medications. In addition, especially in Europe, equine veterinarians are forced to use many drugs off-label, as the horse is classified as a "food-producing animal" and many veterinary drugs are labeled specifically not for use in animals intended for human consumption.

In the United States, this practice is permitted by the Animal Medicinal Drug Use Clarification Act of 1994 (P.L. 103-396). The FDA specifically prohibits extralabel use of a number of antibiotics, anti-inflammatory drugs and hormones in food producing animals. FDA also tightly controls the use of certain veterinary-prescribed drugs when administered in the feed of food-producing animals.

== See also ==
- List of drugs known for off-label use
- Marketing of off-label use
- Pharmaceutical marketing
