= David Franklin (scientist) =

American microbiologist

- Born: 1961 (age 64–65); Rhode Island, United States
- Education: University of Rhode Island (doctoral); Harvard Medical School (Post-doctoral)
- Known for: Precedent setting stance against pharmaceutical industry fraud. Automated decision-making Multiple-criteria decision analysis Renowned modern art and contemporary art collection.
- Awards: Dana–Farber Cancer Institute Abraham Fellowship in Pediatric Oncology; National Research Service Award
- Scientific career
- Fields: Biotechnology/Entrepreneurship; Evidence-based medicine Dempster–Shafer theory Decision theory Complex adaptive system
- Workplaces: BSX; IDXX; Parke-Davis
- Doctoral advisor: Paul Cohen
- Other academic advisors: Barbara Bierer; Jamie Ferreira

David Franklin is an American microbiologist and former fellow of Harvard Medical School who while employed by Parke-Davis filed the 1996 whistleblower lawsuit exposing their illegal promotion of Neurontin (gabapentin) for off-label uses. Franklin's suit, filed on behalf of the citizens of the United States under the qui tam provisions of US federal and state law, uncovered illegal pharmaceutical industry practices and created new legal precedent that resulted in a cascade of criminal convictions and civil and criminal penalties against Pfizer and several other pharmaceutical companies totaling more than $7 billion. Civil cases also followed Franklin v. Parke-Davis. Insurance companies, led by Kaiser Permanente, sued Pfizer for fraud and violation of the federal Racketeer Influenced and Corrupt Organizations Act; the Kaiser case settled in April 2014 after Pfizer's appeal at the US Supreme Court was rejected. Franklin v. Pfizer also spawned more than a thousand wrongful death (suicide) suits associated with use of Neurontin. Numerous books have addressed the social, economic and healthcare implications of Dr. Franklin's stance and actions. The settlement was the first off-label promotion settlement under the False Claims Act.

== Franklin v. Parke-Davis case ==
Franklin's suit, filed under the False Claims Act, claimed that Parke-Davis (since acquired by Pfizer) had used fraudulent scientific evidence supported by "tens of thousands of payments" to doctors for "consultations" and "studies" to encourage them to prescribe the drug Neurontin for conditions including migraine, bipolar disorder and attention deficit disorder, even though it was approved for use only as adjunctive treatment in patients with partial seizures and postherpetic neuralgia. Prescribing a drug for such off-label use was not itself illegal, but promoting such use was prohibited by the U.S. Food and Drug Administration and federal law.

The case revealed that the company marketed the drug for these illnesses while withholding evidence that the drug was not effective for these illnesses. After initially denying wrongdoing, Pfizer pleaded guilty on 13 May 2004 to criminal violation of the Federal Food, Drug, and Cosmetic Act and paid a criminal fine of $240 million and $152m to state and federal healthcare programmes. Under the False Claims Act, Dr Franklin received $24.6m as part of the settlement agreement.

Franklin v. Parke-Davis opened a unique window into pharmaceutical industry practices through UCSF's archiving and study of documents obtained by Franklin's attorney Thomas Greene. The case was unique in a number of ways: it was the largest settlement obtained for U.S. taxpayers in a case not joined by the Department of Justice, it established a new standard of accountability for pharmaceutical industry marketing practices, it broadened the use of the False Claims Act to include fraudulent marketing claims (not just financial fraud) as criminal violations of federal and state law, it revealed the involvement, complicity and active participation in fraud by many renowned physicians, and it demonstrated that the medical literature which is the foundation for medical practice (particularly off-label prescribing by physicians) has been deeply adulterated by the pharmaceutical industry and its paid clinical consultants.
