= Barry Meier =

American writer and journalist

- Born: 1949
- Education: Syracuse University
- Occupations: Author; Columnist
- Employer(s): The Wall Street Journal; New York Newsday; The New York Times
- Awards: Pulitzer Prize

Barry Meier is a writer and former New York Times journalist who wrote the 2003 non-fiction book Pain Killer: A Wonder Drug's Trail of Addiction and Death. His articles "have led to Congressional hearings and changes in federal laws".

== Education ==
Meier studied at Syracuse University.

=== Career ===
In his career as journalist, Meier has specialized in reporting on business, public policy, and health and safety. He reported for The Wall Street Journal for five years, worked at New York Newsday as a special projects reporter, and reported for The New York Times. According to his The Times profile, his articles published by The Times and elsewhere "have led to Congressional hearings and changes in federal laws."

== Pain Killer book ==
In 2001, Meier began investigating Purdue Pharma and OxyContin, when it was still a relatively unknown drug made by a relatively unknown family, the Sacklers, including Mortimer Sackler and his brother Raymond Sackler, their children and grandchildren—at that time "one of the wealthiest families in the United States". In an August 24, 2001 Meier recorded an interview with Purdue CEO Michael Friedman and executives Howard Udell and Dr. Paul Goldenheim, who told Meier "they had learned of OxyContin’s growing abuse only in early 2000, a statement they also made before congressional committees". They said the company had undertaken a "massive marketing campaign", based on a "unique claim" for OxyContin, with FDA permission, that, "as a long-acting opioid, it might be less likely to cause abuse and addiction than shorter-acting painkillers like Percocet." In 2001 Meier published Pain Killer: A Wonder Drug's Trail of Addiction and Death. A 2004 New York Times review of the book concluded:

For years, doctors who prescribed OxyContin were told that the risk of addiction to the painkiller was less than 1 percent. Only after the drug had devastated thousands of lives was it revealed that this figure, touted as scientific fact, was based on a small study that had no relevance for the general public.

The Painkiller, a television miniseries was based on Meyer's book Pain Killer and "The Family That Built an Empire of Pain", a New Yorker article by Patrick Radden Keefe. The series premiered on Netflix on August 10, 2023.

== Spooked (2021) ==
Meier's 2021 book entitled Spooked: The Trump Dossier, Black Cube, and the Rise of Private Spies focused on the former The Wall Street Journal journalist, Glenn R. Simpson and the company he founded and co-owned—Fusion GPS—the spy they hired—Christopher Steele—and his report—the Steele dossier prior to the 2016 United States presidential election.

== Works ==
- Meier, Barry (May 3, 2016). Missing Man: The American Spy Who Vanished in Iran. Farrar, Straus and Giroux. ISBN 978-0374210458.
- Meier, Barry (May 29, 2018). Pain Killer: An Empire of Deceit and the Origin of America's Opioid Epidemic (2nd ed.). Random House. ISBN 978-0525511106.
- Meier, Barry (May 18, 2021). Spooked: The Trump Dossier, Black Cube, and the Rise of Private Spies. Harper. ISBN 978-0062950680.
