= Franklin v. Parke-Davis =

1996 lawsuit

- Court: United States District Court for the District of Massachusetts
- Full case name: United States of America ex rel. David Franklin v. Parke-Davis, Division of Warner-Lambert Company
- Decided: August 22, 2003
- Docket nos.: 1:96-cv-11651
- Citation: 2003 WL 22048255

Case history
- Prior actions: Motion to dismiss granted in part, denied in part, 147 F. Supp. 2d 39 (D. Mass. 2001); protective order modified, 210 F.R.D. 257 (D. Mass. 2002).

Holding
- Off-label promotion of pharmaceutical products which causes false claims for payment under the federal Medicaid program is a valid theory of recovery under the False Claims Act.

Court membership
- Judge sitting: Patti B. Saris

Keywords
- False Claims Act

Franklin v. Parke-Davis is a lawsuit filed in 1996 against Parke-Davis, a division of Warner-Lambert Company, and eventually against Pfizer (which bought Warner-Lambert in 2000) under the qui tam provisions of the False Claims Act. The suit was commenced by David Franklin, a microbiologist hired in the spring of 1996 in a sales capacity at Parke-Davis, a pharmaceutical subsidiary of Warner-Lambert (Warner-Lambert was subsequently acquired by Pfizer in 2000). In denying the defendants' motion for summary judgment, the court for the first time recognized off-label promotion of drugs could cause Medicaid to pay for prescriptions that were not reimbursable, triggering False Claims Act liability. The case was also significant in exposing the degree to which publication bias impacts the randomized controlled studies conducted by pharmaceutical companies to test the efficacy of their products. Ultimately, the parties reached a settlement agreement of $430 million to resolve all civil claims and criminal charges stemming from the qui tam complaint. At the time of the settlement in May 2004, it represented one of the largest False Claims Act recoveries against a pharmaceutical company in U.S. history, and was the first off-label promotion settlement under the False Claims Act.

== Factual background ==
After four months of employment at Parke-Davis, Franklin became disillusioned by what he believed to be the company's illegal marketing practices in connection with sales of the drug Neurontin.

In December 1993, the Food and Drug Administration (FDA) had approved Neurontin as a secondary course of treatment for epilepsy, to be used only when the first medication had not brought the epileptic seizures entirely under control. Warner-Lambert executives found the potential revenue in that indication was too low, and decided to promote Neurontin for additional indications, for which the drug was not approved by the FDA and for which there was little to no evidence, including migraines, bipolar disorder and attention-deficit disorder. Members of the Parke-Davis sales team, including medical liaisons like Franklin, were hired to conduct this marketing. Franklin also alleged that physicians and other health care providers were paid illegal kickbacks as a quid pro quo for prescribing Neurontin, including expensive meals, stays at luxury resorts, and cash payments and that Parke-Davis hired ad agencies and marketing firms to produce articles about gabapentin describing the drug's emerging uses and recruited physicians and paid them to sign their names to the ghost written articles as authors.

According to Franklin, a case report stating that Neurontin had made a child's attention deficit disorder worse, and his supervisor's dismissal of the report, was a key factor in his decision to leave Parke-Davis in July 1996 after only four months of employment. He also reported being told by a supervisor that his career would be threatened or ended if he continued to raise objections, and this is what finally prompted him to quit and hire a Boston attorney, Thomas M. Greene.

== Lawsuit ==
In August 1996, Franklin and attorney Thomas Greene filed a qui tam complaint in the United States District Court for the District of Massachusetts in Boston under the False Claims Act, a federal statute which permits private citizen-whistleblowers (also known as "relators") to sue on behalf of the federal government for fraud involving federal money.

Franklin's suit proposed a novel theory, that Warner-Lambert had perpetrated a fraud against the federal government by causing doctors and patients to submit claims for reimbursement to Medicaid that Medicaid should not pay for, since by law, Medicaid only pays for treatments that are either approved by the FDA, or are otherwise "medically accepted" (as evidenced, for instance, by being included in an approved list of drugs and their uses). The suit also alleged that Warner-Lambert had broken federal kickback laws.

The suit remained sealed for three years while the Department of Justice decided if it would intervene and take over the case, which it had the right to do under the False Claims Act. In 1999, the government declined, and the case moved forward. The defendants sought to have the complaint dismissed, arguing that the causal link between any representations made by Parke-Davis sales representatives and reimbursements for off-label Neurontin prescriptions was too remote. Furthermore, Warner-Lambert argued that Franklin could only prove the pharmaceutical company's liability by showing that Parke-Davis sales liaisons made fraudulent misrepresentations about the drug, as opposed to merely engaging in truthful off-label promotion.

In an opinion handed down on August 22, 2003, District Judge Patti B. Saris agreed with David Franklin, denying Warner Lambert's summary judgment motion to dismiss the lawsuit. Judge Saris found that, if it could be proven that the off-label marketing of Neurontin caused doctors to prescribe the drug and submit prescriptions to Medicaid, then the company would indeed be liable under the False Claims Act. In addition, Judge Saris found that the submission of false Medicaid claims was a foreseeable result of Warner-Lambert's marketing scheme. The case established for the first time that drug companies could be held liable under the False Claims Act for off-label promotion of pharmaceutical products.

== Settlement ==
On May 13, 2004, the Department of Justice announced that it had reached an agreement with Warner-Lambert and Pfizer. Warner-Lambert agreed to pay $430 million to resolve criminal and civil liability related to the off-label promotion of Neurontin, and also agreed to plead guilty to two felony counts of misbranding drugs under the Federal Food, Drug, and Cosmetic Act, resulting in a $240 million criminal fine. Civil damages under the False Claims Act were paid out to the federal government in the amount of $83.6 million, and damages paid out to the states totaled $106.4 million. Relator David Franklin was awarded one of the highest shares ever under the False Claims Act, 29.5% of the settlement, in recognition of his important role in exposing the illicit marketing scheme. Pfizer agreed to institute a corporate compliance program as part of the settlement. Also as part of the settlement the Consumer & Prescriber Grant Program was established to fund public programs to raise awareness of problems with pharmaceutical advertising.

== Impact ==
Since the settlement in 2004, whistleblowers and the federal government have prosecuted numerous off-label promotion cases under the False Claims Act using this case as a precedent.

Subsequent research reported that the wrongful promotion of the drug was planned by integrating it into Continuing medical education, supporting consultants and members of medical advisory boards to recommend the use to institutions, and paying people to write about the drug in any positive context including in academic literature, letters to the editor, and managing the STEPS trial as a seeding trial.

Litigation around the marketing of ethyl eicosapentaenoic acid (branded as "Vascepa") by Amarin Corporation led to a 2015 court decision that changed the FDA's approach to off-label marketing.
