= List of off-label promotion pharmaceutical settlements =

The following are settlements reached with US authorities against pharmaceutical companies to resolve allegations of "off-label" promotion of drugs. Under the Federal Food, Drug, and Cosmetic Act, it is illegal for pharmaceutical companies to promote their products for uses not approved by the Food and Drug Administration (FDA), and corporations that market drugs for off-label indications may be subject to civil liability under the False Claims Act as well as criminal penalties.

== Off-label promotion settlements under the False Claims Act ==
Descriptions of the lawsuits are listed in chronological order.

=== Parke-Davis, Warner-Lambert and Pfizer: Off-label promotion of Neurontin, May 2004 ===
In 1996, whistleblower David Franklin left his position as a medical liaison with Parke-Davis, a pharmaceutical division of Warner-Lambert Company, after learning of the company's marketing strategy to promote the epilepsy drug Neurontin for uses not approved by the FDA. Franklin and his attorney, Thomas M. Greene, filed a lawsuit, Franklin v. Parke-Davis, under the False Claims Act in federal district court in Boston. In the first off-label promotion case ever litigated in a whistleblower suit under the False Claims Act, the settlement was announced after eight years of litigation in May 2004. Warner-Lambert agreed to pay $430 million to resolve all civil and criminal liability, with $24.64 million going to Franklin for his participation in the lawsuit. It is one of the largest recoveries against a pharmaceutical company in U.S. history. The total settlement remained the largest against a pharmaceutical company in a non-intervened False Claims Act case until a July 2017 settlement against Celgene Corporation exceeded it, as the civil settlement in that case was $280 million while the civil component of the Parke-Davis case settled for $190 million.

=== Serono: Off-label promotion of Serostim, October 2005 ===
Serono, a Swiss biotechnology company, obtained approval from the FDA for the drug Serostim in 1996 to treat AIDS wasting, a condition in which AIDS patients experience rapid weight loss. However, around the same time, the advent of more robust protease inhibitors that could interact in AIDS cocktails to markedly slow the advancement of the syndrome led to a decline in symptoms of AIDS wasting and, consequently, demand for Serostim. As a result, according to prosecutors, Serono devised a marketing scheme by which the definition of AIDS wasting would be changed to measure a loss in "body cell mass". The company then created a computerized medical test designed to detect loss of body cell mass and thereby diagnose AIDS wasting even in patients who had not experienced any weight loss. Serono ultimately agreed to pay $704 million to resolve all civil and criminal liability. Five whistleblowers, all former employees of Serono, initiated complaints under the False Claims Act, ultimately leading to the government's investigation. The whistleblowers shared in a $51 million reward from the settlement.

=== Schering-Plough: Off-label promotion of Intron A and Temodar, August 2006 ===
Schering-Plough pleaded guilty to one count of conspiracy to make false statements to the Medicaid program in connection with the pricing of its allergy drug Claritin. Allegations of off-label promotion, however, centered on the off-label promotion of several cancer drugs. The drug Temodar, which was approved by the Food and Drug Administration (FDA) in 1999 for treatment of a specific type of brain tumor, was allegedly being promoted as a treatment for other types of brain cancer for which it had not been approved. Schering-Plough allegedly promoted Intron A, meanwhile, for use in superficial bladder cancer and hepatitis C. The case arose from claims filed under the False Claims Act; the company was forced to pay a $180 million criminal fine and an additional $255 million to settle all civil claims.

=== InterMune: Off-label promotion of Actimmune, October 2006 ===
In 2007, InterMune abandoned all efforts to develop the drug Actimmune, which goes by the generic name of Interferon-gamma, as a treatment for idiopathic pulmonary fibrosis (IPF), a chronic lung condition, after experimental trials showed the drug was ineffective at treating the disease. The decision was announced after the company agreed to pay $36.9 million to resolve criminal charges and civil liability in connection with InterMune's off-label promotion of the drug, which had only been approved by the FDA to treat chronic granulomatous disease and severe malignant osteopetrosis, both extremely rare illnesses which would have generated sales of only $20 million a year. Sales of the drug to treat IPF, however, soared as high as $141 million in the year 2003. InterMune's yearly sales were entirely from Actimmune.

=== Cell Therapeutics: Off-label promotion of Trisenox, April 2007 ===
In a qui tam suit filed under the False Claims Act by whistleblower James Marchese, Cell Therapeutics agreed to settle claims for $10.5 million that it illegally promoted the cancer drug Trisenox. Trisenox won approval by the FDA in 2000 to treat a relatively rare form of leukemia known as acute promyelocytic leukemia, but the manufacturer promoted Trisenox as effective treatment for other cancers for which the drug was not approved.

=== Medicis Pharmaceutical: Off-label promotion of Loprox, May 2007 ===
This settlement of $9.8 million resolved allegations that Medicis Pharmaceutical promoted Loprox, a topical skin preparation, for use on children under the age of 10 despite the fact that use in children under 10 had not been approved by the FDA. According to the government and the whistleblower complaint filed by four former Medicis sales representatives under the False Claims Act, pediatricians were urged to prescribe Loprox as a treatment for diaper rash. The four relators shared a $1,078,000 reward for providing information in the lawsuit.

=== Orphan Medical and Jazz Pharmaceuticals: Off-label promotion of Xyrem, July 2007 ===
Orphan Medical, a subsidiary of Jazz Pharmaceuticals, pleaded guilty to felony misbranding under the FDCA and agreed to pay $20 million to resolve all civil claims and criminal charges in connection with Xyrem, a drug approved by the FDA for narcolepsy and the street version of which is classified by the Drug Enforcement Administration as a Schedule I drug. Although the drug's distribution as a narcolepsy medication is strictly regulated, the complaint filed under the False Claims Act alleged that the company promoted the drug as a treatment for depression, insomnia, and fibromyalgia.

This case was later overturned as the drug was found to be effective for insomnia and fibromyalgia. In 2012, the Second Circuit Court of Appeals further expanded First Amendment commercial speech protection in the realm of pharmaceutical marketing in United States v. Caronia. The court overturned a pharmaceutical sales representative's conviction arising from a recording of his promotion of off-label use of Xyrem (sodium oxybate) to a group of doctors. Xyrem was approved for the indication of excessive daytime sleepiness, but Caronia promoted it for insomnia and fibromyalgia. The court held that convicting the sales representative for off-label marketing that was not untruthful or misleading violated his First Amendment rights. In contrast, off-label promotion that is untruthful and misleading would be fraudulent, and thus not protected by the First Amendment.

=== Bristol-Myers Squibb and Otsuka American: Off-label promotion of Abilify, September 2007 ===
In a settlement totaling $515 million to settle a host of civil charges and civil liabilities related to alleged illegal pricing and marketing practices for several of its drugs, Bristol-Myers Squibb paid out approximately $50 million to settle seven qui tam suits filed under the False Claims Act. Specifically, the company engaged in off-label promotion of Abilify, an antipsychotic drug approved by the FDA to treat adult schizophrenia and bi-polar disorder. The government alleged that Bristol promoted the drug for pediatric use and to treat dementia, both of which are off-label uses.

=== Cephalon: Off-label promotion of Actiq, Gabitril and Provigil, September 2008 ===
Cephalon, a Pennsylvania-based drug company, paid out $425 million, $50 million of which was paid to resolve a criminal indictment for violations of the FDCA, and $375 million to dispose of claims brought under the False Claims Act. Four qui tam relators who filed suits collectively recovered $46,469,978 as their share. The FDA approved Actiq, a fentanyl product manufactured as a lollipop, for use in cancer patients for whom morphine-based painkillers are no longer effective. According to the government, Cephalon promoted Actiq for use in non-cancer patients to treat such conditions as migraines, sickle-cell pain crises, and other injuries. Gabitril, meanwhile, received FDA approval as a treatment for partial seizures, but the manufacturer allegedly marketed the drug for anxiety, insomnia, and pain. Provigil was initially approved to treat excessive daytime sleepiness resulting from narcolepsy, and later approved the drug for further label indications. Cephalon allegedly promoted Provigil for a five-year period as a non-stimulant drug for the treatment of sleepiness, tiredness, decreased activity, lack of energy, and fatigue.

=== Eli Lilly: Off-label promotion of Zyprexa, January 2009 ===
After four whistleblowers initially filed suits under the False Claims Act, prompting a government investigation, Eli Lilly and Company agreed to plead guilty and pay $1.415 billion for promoting its drug Zyprexa for uses not approved by the FDA. Specifically, the private whistleblower complaints and the government alleged that Eli Lilly engaged in a marketing scheme over a period of several years to promote the drug's use in children and the elderly, groups particularly vulnerable to the product's side effects. An antipsychotic drug initially approved in 2000 to treat manifestations of certain psychotic disorders, the government's indictment contended that Eli Lilly deliberately marketed the drug to treat agitation, aggression, hostility, dementia, Alzheimer's dementia, depression and generalized sleep disorder, none of which were uses approved by the FDA.

=== Pfizer: Off-label promotion of Bextra, Geodon, Zyvox and Lyrica, September 2009 ===
In what was the largest pharmaceutical settlement in U.S. history at the time, Pfizer reached a $2.3 billion settlement with the Department of Justice to resolve criminal charges and civil claims under the False Claims Act. The pharmaceutical giant was accused of off-label promotion of the anti-inflammatory drug Bextra; Geodon, an anti-psychotic drug; Zyvox, an antibiotic; and Lyrica, an anti-epileptic drug. The drugs were allegedly promoted for uses not approved by the FDA, and therefore the company's marketing caused non-reimbursable prescriptions to be paid by Medicare and Medicaid (Medicare and Medicaid do not reimburse for off-label drug prescriptions). Six whistleblowers shared a $102 million reward under the False Claims Act.

=== Alpharma: Off-label promotion of Kadian, March 2010 ===
After a government investigation precipitated by a whistleblower suit filed by Debra Parks under the False Claims Act in 2006, Alpharma agreed to a $42.5 million settlement to resolve all civil and criminal liability in connection with the company's alleged off-label marketing of Kadian. According to the government, the company promoted Kadian, a morphine-based drug, for uses unapproved by the FDA. In addition, the company made misrepresentations about the safety and efficacy of the drug.

=== AstraZeneca: Off-label promotion of Seroquel, April 2010 ===
A qui tam suit filed under the False Claims Act led AstraZeneca to make a massive $520 million settlement to resolve all civil and criminal liability with respect to illegal promotion of the anti-psychotic drug Seroquel. Approved by the FDA in 1997 to treat manifestations of psychotic disorders, in 2000 the FDA subsequently approved Seroquel for short-term treatment of schizophrenia, bipolar disorder, and bipolar depression. Between January 2001 through December 2006, AstraZeneca promoted Seroquel to psychiatrists and other physicians for certain uses that were not approved by the FDA, including aggression, Alzheimer's disease, anger management, anxiety, attention deficit hyperactivity disorder, bipolar maintenance, dementia, depression, mood disorder, post-traumatic stress disorder, and sleeplessness. Federal health programs do not reimburse for prescriptions prescribed for indications not approved by the FDA.

=== Ortho-McNeil-Janssen: Off-label promotion of Topamax, May 2010 ===
Two subsidiaries of Johnson & Johnson, Ortho-McNeil Pharmaceutical and Ortho-McNeil-Janssen, agreed to pay more than $81 million to settle all civil and criminal liability as a result of the companies’ illegal marketing of Topamax, an anti-epileptic drug. As part of the settlement, Ortho-McNeil agreed to plead guilty to one count of a misdemeanor violation of the Food, Drug, and Cosmetic Act. The criminal fine amounted to $6.1 million, and the government recovered $75 million in damages under the False Claims Act. The whistleblowers who filed suit under the False Claims Act stood to recover, collectively, more than $9 million.

=== Novartis: Off-label promotion of Tobi, May 2010 ===
Novartis Vaccines & Diagnostics and Novartis Pharmaceuticals Corporation agreed to pay $72.5 million to settle claims brought under the False Claims Act alleging off-label promotion of the cystic fibrosis drug Tobi between 2001 and 2006.

=== Allergan: Off-label promotion of Botox, September 2010 ===
Allergan, the manufacturer of Botox, agreed to a $600 million settlement to resolve all civil and criminal liability surrounding the promotion of Botox for treatment of chronic migraines before FDA review or approval of the drug for such use.

=== Novartis: Off-label promotion of Trileptal, September 2010 ===
Novartis made a settlement of $422.5 million, including a $185 million criminal fine and forfeiture for the off-label promotion of the anti-epilepsy drug Trileptal. Trileptal was approved by the FDA to treat partial seizures, but was allegedly promoted to treat pain and some psychiatric conditions. The government also accused Novartis of paying illegal kickbacks to healthcare providers.

=== Forest Laboratories: Off-label promotion of Levothroid, Celexa and Lexapro, September 2010 ===
Forest Laboratories made a settlement of more than $313 million to resolve all criminal and civil liability related to three different drugs. Forest Laboratories pleaded guilty to obstruction of justice and illegal distribution of Levothroid, which at the time was an unapproved new drug. The settlement also resolved allegations of off-label marketing of Celexa, an antidepressant approved to treat adult depression. According to the government, Forest marketed Celexa for use in children and adolescents.

=== Élan: Off-label promotion of Zonegran, December 2010 ===
Irish pharmaceutical company Élan and its U.S. subsidiary agreed to pay $203 million to resolve allegations that the company engaged in off-label promotion of the anti-epilepsy drug Zonegran. Eisai, a Japanese drug marketer that purchased the drug from Élan, agreed to pay $11 million. The settlement resolved claims of illegal promotion under the Food, Drug, and Cosmetic Act as well as civil claims filed under the False Claims Act.

=== Kos Pharmaceuticals: Off-label promotion of Advicor and Niaspan, December 2010 ===
Kos Pharmaceuticals, a subsidiary of Abbott Laboratories, agreed to a settlement of more than $41 million to dispose of all civil and criminal liability resulting from the company's off-label promotion and illegal payment of kickbacks in the marketing of Advicor and Niaspan. The Department of Justice entered into a deferred prosecution agreement with Kos based on actions taken by the company to conduct internal investigations and its ongoing cooperation with the government.

=== UCB: Off-label promotion of Keppra, June 2011 ===
The U.S. subsidiary of UCB, a Belgian pharmaceutical company, agreed to pay more than $34 million as part of a settlement agreement to resolve all criminal and civil liability arising from its alleged off-label promotion of the epilepsy drug Keppra. UCB was alleged to have promoted the drug for the treatment of migraine headaches, a use for which Keppra had not received FDA approval.

=== Novo Nordisk: Off-label promotion of NovoSeven, June 2011 ===
Novo Nordisk, a Danish drug manufacturer, agreed to a $25 million settlement to resolve allegations of illegal promotion of the drug NovoSeven, approved by the FDA to treat certain bleeding disorders in hemophiliacs. The government's complaint alleged numerous off-label uses for which the company promoted the drug, including as a coagulatory agent for trauma patients, general surgery, cardiac surgery, liver surgery, liver transplants and intra-cerebral hemorrhage.

=== Pfizer: Off-label promotion of Detrol, October 2011 ===
As was the case in the 2004 Pfizer settlement over off-label promotion of Neurontin, in 2011 Pfizer agreed to a settlement as a result of a whistleblower complaint filed under the False Claims Act without intervention by the Department of Justice. The $14.5 million settlement arose from a complaint which alleged that Pfizer was engaging in the illegal promotion of Detrol, a drug approved by the FDA to treat urinary incontinence, for off-label uses.

=== Abbott Laboratories: Off-label promotion of Depakote, May 2012 ===
Abbott Laboratories agreed to pay $800 million to resolve its criminal and civil liability arising from the company's unlawful promotion of the prescription drug Depakote for uses not approved as safe and effective by the FDA. The company misbranded Depakote by promoting the drug to control agitation and aggression in elderly dementia patients and to treat schizophrenia when neither of these uses was FDA approved. This settlement figure represents resolution of other claims in addition to off-label promotion.

=== GlaxoSmithKline: Off-label promotion of Paxil, Wellbutrin, Advair, Lamictal and Zofran, July 2012 ===
GlaxoSmithKline (GSK) agreed to pay $1.043 billion relating to false claims arising from off-label promotion. GSK promoted the drugs Paxil and Wellbutrin for unapproved, non-covered uses. GSK also promoted its asthma drug, Advair, for first-line therapy for mild asthma patients even though it was not approved or medically appropriate under these circumstances. GSK also promoted Advair for chronic obstructive pulmonary disease with misleading claims as to the relevant treatment guidelines. GSK also promoted Lamictal, an anti-epileptic medication, for off-label, non-covered psychiatric uses, neuropathic pain and pain management. Further, GSK promoted certain forms of Zofran, approved only for post-operative nausea, for the treatment of morning sickness in pregnant women. This settlement figure represents resolution of other claims in addition to off-label promotion.

=== Amgen: Off-label promotion of Aranesp, Enbrel and Neulasta, December 2012 ===
Amgen agreed to pay $612 million for the off-label promotion of three drugs it manufactured, Enbrel and Neulasta. Amgen promoted the sale and use of Aranesp for dosing regiments and indications which were (a) not approved by the FDA, and (b) not medically accepted indications, including anemia caused by cancer, anemia caused by chronic disease, chronic anemia, and anemia caused by myelodysplastic syndrome. Similarly, Amgen promoted its drugs Enbrel and Neulasta for off-label indications that were not eligible for coverage by federal health care programs. This settlement figure represents resolution of other claims in addition to off-label promotion.

=== Par Pharmaceutical: Off-label promotion of Megace ES, March 2013 ===
Par Pharmaceutical agreed to pay $22.5 million to the federal government and various states to resolve claims arising from its off-label marketing. Par made unsubstantiated and misleading representations about the superiority of Megace ES over generic megestrol acetate for elderly patients to encourage providers to switch patients from generic megestrol acetate to Megace ES, despite having conducted no well-controlled studies to support a claim of greater efficacy for Megace ES. Except as admitted in the plea agreement, the claims settled by the civil settlement agreement are allegations only, and there has been no determination of liability as to those claims.

=== Wyeth Pharmaceuticals: Off-label promotion of Rapamune, July 2013 ===
Wyeth, which was acquired by Pfizer in 2009, agreed to pay $257.4 million to resolve claims involving off-label promotion of the immunosuppressant drug Rapamune. The government alleged that Wyeth violated the False Claims Act, from 1998 through 2009, by promoting Rapamune for unapproved uses, some of which were not medically accepted indications and, therefore, were not covered by Medicare, Medicaid and other federal health care programs. These unapproved uses included non-renal transplants, conversion use (switching a patient from another immunosuppressant to Rapamune) and using Rapamune in combination with other immunosuppressive agents not listed on the label.

=== Johnson & Johnson: Off-label promotion of Risperdal, Invega and Natrecor, November 2013 ===
Johnson & Johnson agreed to pay $1.391 billion to resolve false claims resulting from its off-label promotion of Risperdal, Invega and Natrecor. Risperdal was approved only to treat schizophrenia, yet Janssen, a Johnson and Johnson (J&J) subsidiary, promoted Risperdal to physicians and other prescribers who treated elderly dementia patients by urging the prescribers to use Risperdal to treat symptoms such as anxiety, agitation, depression, hostility and confusion. Similarly, although Invega was approved only for the treatment of schizophrenia and schizoaffective disorder, from 2006 through 2009, J&J and Janssen marketed the drug for off-label indications. Finally, Scios Inc,. a subsidiary of J&J, launched an aggressive campaign to market Natrecor for scheduled, serial outpatient infusions for patients with less severe heart failure – a use not included in the FDA-approved label and not covered by federal health care programs. This settlement figure represents resolution of other claims in addition to off-label promotion.

=== CareFusion: Off-label promotion of ChloraPrep, January 2014 ===
CareFusion agreed to pay $40.1 million to resolve allegations of off-label promotion of ChloraPrep. ChloraPrep had been approved by the FDA for the preparation of a patient's skin prior to surgery or injection. This settlement also resolves allegations that, during the period between September 2009 and August 2011, CareFusion knowingly promoted the sale of ChloraPrep for uses that were not approved by the FDA, some of which were not medically accepted indications, and made unsubstantiated representations about the appropriate uses of ChloraPrep. This settlement figure represents resolution of other claims in addition to off-label promotion.

=== Endo Pharmaceuticals: Off-label promotion of Lidoderm, February 2014 ===
Endo Pharmaceuticals agreed to pay $171.9 million to resolve civil liability under the False Claims Act for its off-label promotion of Lidoderm. The government charged that, between 2002 and 2006, Endo misbranded Lidoderm and introduced it into interstate commerce in violation of the Food, Drug and Cosmetic Act (FDCA). Lidoderm's labeling lacked adequate directions for use in the treatment of non-PHN related pain, including low back pain, diabetic neuropathy and carpal tunnel syndrome. These uses were intended by Endo Pharmaceuticals Inc. but never approved by the FDA.

=== Insys Therapeutics: Off-label promotion of Opioid drug Subsys, August 2015 ===
In August 2015, Insys Therapeutics reached a $1.1 million settlement with the Oregon Department of Justice, resolving allegations that it promoted its opioid drug Subsys to treat off-label non-cancer uses that were not approved by the FDA. Insys has also paid New Hampshire $2.9 million to settle allegations of aggressive marketing of Subsys.

=== Acclarent Inc.: Off-label promotion of Sinus Spacer Product, July 2016 ===
On July 22, 2016, California-based medical device manufacturer and Johnson & Johnson subsidiary Acclarent Inc. agreed to pay $18 million to resolve allegations that it marketed and distributed its sinus spacer product for use as a drug delivery device without FDA approval. The government alleged that it continued its off-label marketing even after the FDA rejected the company's request to expand the approved uses, and even though the company added a warning to its label regarding the use of active drug substances in the device. On July 20, 2016, the company's former CEO and former Vice President of Sales also were convicted following a trial of ten misdemeanor counts of introducing adulterated and misbranded medical devices into interstate commerce.

=== Biocompatibles Inc.: Off-label promotion of LC Bead, November 2016 ===
On November 7, 2016, medical device company Biocompatibles Inc., a subsidiary of BTG plc agreed to pay $25 million to resolve allegations that it violated the False Claims Act by causing false claims to be submitted to government health care programs. The company allegedly promoted LC Bead, its embolization device—designed, to be inserted into blood vessels to block the flow of blood to tumors—for off-label use as a "drug-delivery" device, which was not an FDA-approved use and was not supported by substantial clinical evidence. The company also agreed to pay an additional $11 million in criminal fines and forfeitures for a total of $36 million.

=== Bristol-Myers Squibb Company: Off-label promotion of Abilify, December 2016 ===
On December 9, 2016, pharmaceutical company Bristol-Myers Squibb agreed to pay $19.5 million to settle claims with forty-three state attorneys general concerning the alleged off-label promotion of its schizophrenia drug Abilify. The lawsuit alleged the company promoted the drug for use in pediatric populations and to treat dementia and Alzheimer's in elderly patients, despite the fact that those were not FDA-approved uses.

=== Shire PLC: Kickbacks and off-label promotion of Dermagraft, January 2017 ===
In January 2017, Shire PLC Subsidiaries entered into a global resolution under the civil FCA with federal and state governments for $350 million. The settlement largely focused on payment of alleged kickbacks to induce clinics and physicians to use or overuse its product Dermagraft, a bioengineered human skin substitute approved by the FDA for the treatment of diabetic foot ulcers. The settlement also resolved allegations that Shire and its predecessor ABH unlawfully marketed Dermagraft for off-label uses not approved by the FDA, made false statements to inflate the price of Dermagraft, and caused improper coding, verification, or certification of Dermagraft claims and related services. The allegations resolved by the settlement were brought in six lawsuits filed under the qui tam, or whistleblower, provisions of the False Claims Act.

=== Celgene Corporation: Off-label promotion of Revlimid and Thalomid, July 2017 ===
In July 2017, Celgene agreed to pay $280 million to government agencies to settle allegations that it caused the submission of false claims or fraudulent claims for non-reimbursable uses of its drugs Revlimid and Thalomid to Medicare and state Medicaid programs. In addition to listing off-label promotion under the covered conduct, the settlement agreement separately covered alleged "false and misleading" statements Celgene made about the drugs, including by concealing or minimizing adverse events. In its July 2017 Form 10-Q, Celgene disclosed that it resolved the matter in full for $315 million, including fees and expenses. The case was brought under the False Claims Act by Beverly Brown, a former Celgene sales representative.

=== Aegerion Pharmaceuticals: Off-label promotion of Juxtapid, September 2017 ===
On September 22, 2017, Aegerion Pharmaceuticals agreed to pay $28.2 million to resolve allegations that it violated federal marketing rules in promoting its cholesterol medication Juxtapid, resulting in the violation of the Federal False Claims Act and state analogues. The settlement resolved allegations that Aegerion, promoted Juxtapid for off-label uses not approved by the FDA, made false and misleading statements to medical practitioners regarding the drug, violated risk-management regulations designed to ensure safe use, and broke anti-kickback laws with charity donations. In addition to civil False Claims Act liability, Aegerion also agreed to a guilty plea involving the same conduct and to pay a criminal fine and forfeiture of $7.2 million.

=== Boehringer Ingelheim Pharmaceuticals Inc.: off-label promotion of Aggrenox, Atrovent, Combivent, and Micardis, December 2017 ===
In December 2017, Boehringer Ingelheim Pharmaceuticals Inc. agreed to pay $13.5 million to settle claims by all 51 state attorneys general (of the 50 states plus the Attorney General of the District of Columbia) that it engaged in off-label promotion of its drugs Aggrenox, Atrovent and Combivent, and Micardis.

== See also ==
- List of largest pharmaceutical settlements
