= List of largest pharmaceutical settlements =

The following is a list of the 20 largest settlements reached between the United States Department of Justice and pharmaceutical companies from 2001 to 2013, ordered by the size of the total settlement. The settlement amount includes both the civil (False Claims Act) settlement and criminal fine. Glaxo's $3 billion settlement included the largest civil False Claims Act settlement on record, and Pfizer’s $2.3 billion ($3.5 billion in 2022) settlement including a record-breaking $1.3 billion criminal fine. Legal claims against the pharmaceutical industry have varied widely over the past two decades, including Medicare and Medicaid fraud, off-label promotion, and inadequate manufacturing practices. With respect to off-label promotion, specifically, a federal court recognized off-label promotion as a violation of the False Claims Act for the first time in Franklin v. Parke-Davis, leading to a $430 million settlement.

Year	Company	Settlement	Violation(s)	Product(s)	Laws violated (if applicable)
2012	GlaxoSmithKline	$3 billion ($1B criminal, $2B civil)	Criminal: Off-label promotion, failure to disclose safety data. Civil: paying kickbacks to physicians, making false and misleading statements concerning the safety of Avandia, reporting false best prices and underpaying rebates owed under the Medicaid Drug Rebate Program	Avandia (not providing safety data), Wellbutrin, Paxil (promotion of paediatric use), Advair, Lamictal, Zofran, Imitrex, Lotronex, Flovent, Valtrex	False Claims Act, FDCA
2009	Pfizer	$2.3 billion	Off-label promotion, kickbacks	Bextra, Geodon, Zyvox, Lyrica	False Claims Act, FDCA
2013	Johnson & Johnson	$2.2 billion	Off-label promotion, kickbacks	Risperdal, Invega, Nesiritide	False Claims Act, FDCA
2012	Abbott Laboratories	$1.5 billion	Off-label promotion	Depakote	False Claims Act, FDCA
2009	Eli Lilly	$1.4 billion	Off-label promotion	Zyprexa	False Claims Act, FDCA
2001	TAP Pharmaceutical Products	$875 million	Medicare fraud, kickbacks	Lupron	False Claims Act, Prescription Drug Marketing Act
2012	Amgen	$762 million	Off-label promotion, kickbacks	Aranesp	False Claims Act, FDCA
2010	GlaxoSmithKline	$750 million	Poor manufacturing practices	Kytril, Bactroban, Paxil CR, Avandamet	False Claims Act, FDCA
2005	Serono	$704 million	Off-label promotion, kickbacks, monopolistic practices	Serostim	False Claims Act
2008	Merck	$650 million	Medicare fraud, kickbacks	Zocor, Vioxx, Pepsid	False Claims Act, Medicaid Rebate Statute
2007	Purdue Pharma	$601 million	Off-label promotion	Oxycontin	False Claims Act
2010	Allergan	$600 million	Off-label promotion	Botox	False Claims Act, FDCA
2010	AstraZeneca	$520 million	Off-label promotion, kickbacks	Seroquel	False Claims Act
2007	Bristol-Myers Squibb	$515 million	Off-label promotion, kickbacks, Medicare fraud	Abilify, Serzone	False Claims Act, FDCA
2002	Schering-Plough	$500 million	Poor manufacturing practices	Claritin	FDA Current Good Manufacturing Practices
2006	Mylan	$465 million	Misclassification under the Medicaid Drug Rebate Program	EpiPen (epinephrine)	False Claims Act
2006	Schering-Plough	$435 million	Off-label promotion, kickbacks, Medicare fraud	Temodar, Intron A, K-Dur, Claritin RediTabs	False Claims Act, FDCA
2004	Pfizer	$430 million	Off-label promotion	Neurontin	False Claims Act, FDCA
2008	Cephalon	$425 million	Off-label promotion	Actiq, Gabitril, Provigil	False Claims Act, FDCA
2010	Novartis	$423 million	Off-label promotion, kickbacks	Trileptal	False Claims Act, FDCA
2003	AstraZeneca	$355 million	Medicare fraud	Zoladex	Prescription Drug Marketing Act
2004	Schering-Plough	$345 million	Medicare fraud, kickbacks	Claritin	False Claims Act, Anti-Kickback Statute

== See also ==
- Vaccine hesitancy
- Pharmaceutical fraud
- List of off-label promotion pharmaceutical settlements
