= Marketing Festival =

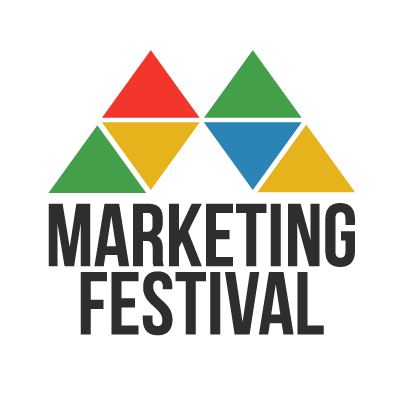
- Status: Active
- Genre: Digital marketing conference
- Frequency: Irregular
- Venue: Janáček Theatre (2025)
- Location: Brno
- Country: Czech Republic
- Years active: 2013–present
- Inaugurated: 22 November 2013
- Founder: Jindřich Fáborský
- Most recent: 28–30 April 2025
- Next event: 20–21 April 2027
- Attendance: More than 1,200 (2025)
- Major events: Lectures; Workshops; Networking events; Concerts; Parties
- Organiser: Marketing Festival s.r.o.
- Website: www.marketingfestival.cz/en/

Marketing Festival is a conference on digital marketing, organised since 2013 by Jindřich Fáborský, his team and the Marketing Festival company.

The Marketing Festival programme consists of a main conference, workshops and accompanying events. The main conference features presentations by Czech and international marketing experts. Workshops and training sessions are held separately and focus on specialised subjects.

Some editions have included evening social, cultural and musical events.

== History ==
The first three editions of Marketing Festival (2013–2015) were held at the Janáček Theatre in Brno. The fourth edition moved to the Gong auditorium in Ostrava in 2016, followed by editions at the Prague Congress Centre in 2017 and 2019.

The 2020 and 2021 editions were held mainly online because of restrictions associated with the COVID-19 pandemic. Following a two-year hiatus, the festival returned to the Janáček Theatre in Brno for its ninth edition in 2024 and its tenth edition in 2025.

== Editions ==
Ten editions of Marketing Festival were held between 2013 and 2025. The table includes a selection of speakers from the main programme rather than a complete list of participants.

Edition	Dates	Location and format	Selected speakers
1st	22–23 November 2013	Brno, Janáček Theatre	Neil Patel, Cyrus Shepard, Brian Carter and Gillian Muessig
2nd	31 October – 2 November 2014	Brno, Janáček Theatre	Avinash Kaushik, Peter Meyers, Simo Ahava and Brian Dean
3rd	26–28 November 2015	Brno, Janáček Theatre	Larry Kim, Marty Neumeier, Aleyda Solis and Cyrus Shepard
4th	20–22 October 2016	Ostrava, Gong	Frederick Vallaeys, Kevin Hillstrom, Michael Lykke Aagaard and Marcus Tober
5th	9–10 November 2017	Prague, Prague Congress Centre	Avinash Kaushik, Rand Fishkin, Bob Hoffman and Kim Goodwin
6th	20–22 March 2019	Prague, Prague Congress Centre	Dan Ariely, Mark Ritson, Christopher Wylie and Wil Reynolds
7th	3–4 September 2020	Online	Tom Goodwin, Les Binet, Peter Field, Richard Shotton and Zoe Scaman
8th	23–24 September 2021	Online; some workshops and the accompanying party were held in person	Mark Ritson, Rory Sutherland, Helen Edwards and Karen Nelson-Field
9th	20–22 February 2024	Brno, Janáček Theatre and nearby venues	Cassie Kozyrkov, Tom Fishburne and André Morys
10th	28–30 April 2025	Brno, Janáček Theatre	Mark Ritson, Zoe Scaman, Tom Roach and Jes Scholz

== Recognition ==
Marketing Festival was nominated twice for the Marketing Inspiration award of Křišťálová Lupa (2014, 2015). Since May 2016, Marketing Festival has been registered as a European trademark.
