= Hotel Windsor, Melbourne =

Hotel in Melbourne, Australia

Hotel Windsor
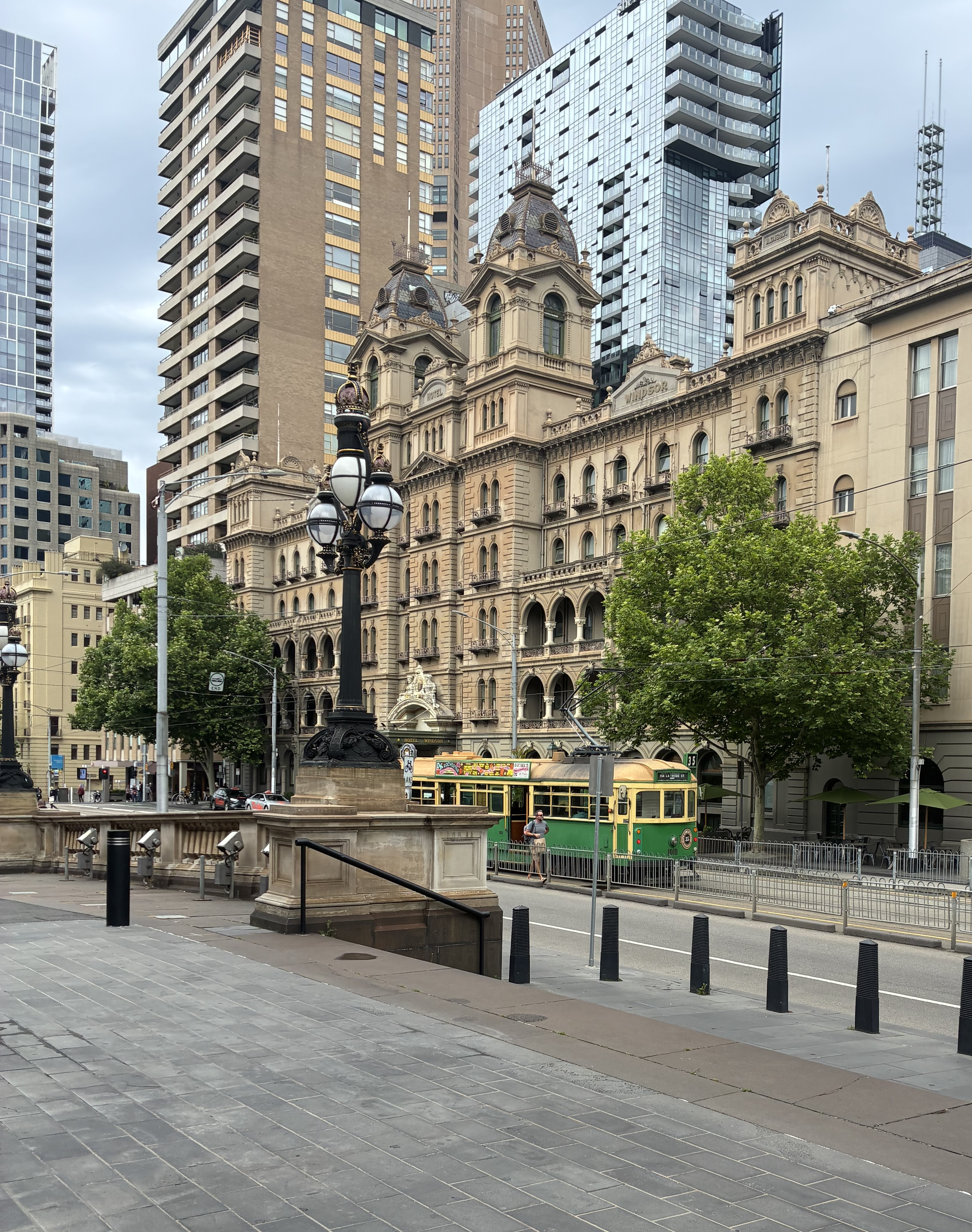
- Hotel Windsor 2025

General information
- Location: 100–150 Spring Street, Melbourne, Victoria
- Coordinates: 37°48′43″S 144°58′22″E
- Opening: 1884 (Grand Hotel); 1888 (Grand Coffee Palace); 1897 (Grand Hotel); 1920 (Windsor Hotel); 2008 (Hotel Windsor)
- Owner: Halim Group
- Operator: Halim Group

Technical details
- Floor count: 5

Design and construction
- Architect: Charles Webb

Other information
- Number of rooms: 180
- Number of suites: 20
- Number of restaurants: 1
- Parking: off-site

Website
- www.thehotelwindsor.com.au

The Hotel Windsor is a luxury hotel in Melbourne, Victoria, Australia. Opened in 1884, the Windsor is notable for being Melbourne's only surviving purpose-built "grand" Victorian era hotel. The Windsor pre-dates other notable grand hotels including The Waldorf Astoria in New York, the Raffles Hotel in Singapore, the Ritz in Paris and the Savoy in London.

The Windsor is situated on Bourke Hill in the Parliament Precinct on Spring Street, and is a Melbourne landmark of high Victorian architecture. For much of the 20th century, the hotel, dubbed the Duchess of Spring Street, was one of the most favoured and luxurious hotels in Melbourne. It has hosted many notable national and international guests, and has a 5-star rating.

== History ==
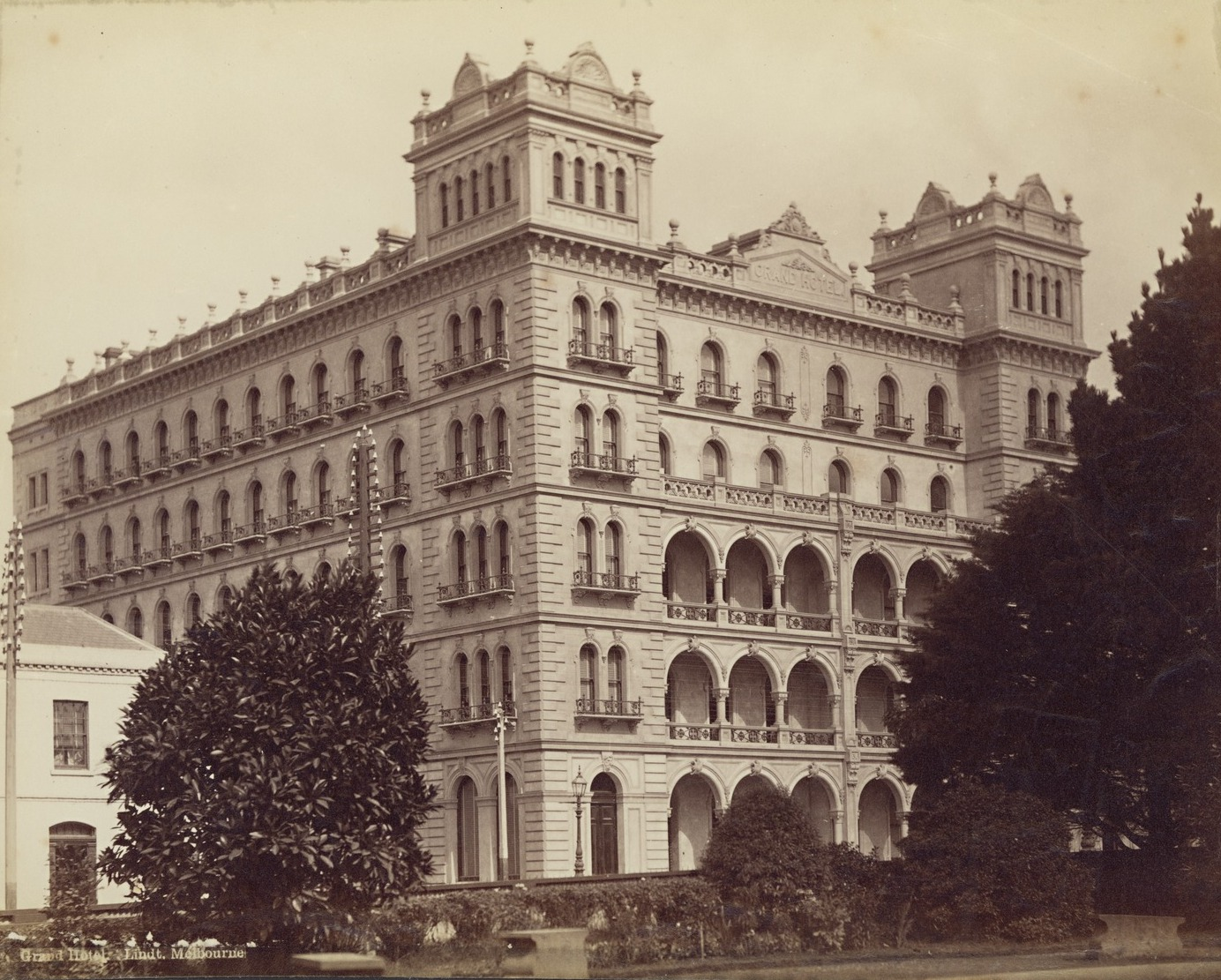
Grand Hotel, Melbourne (ca. 1879-ca. 1894) State Library Victoria H2008.59/15

The original hotel was built by shipping magnate George Nipper and designed by Charles Webb in a broadly Renaissance Revival style and was completed in 1884, and named "The Grand". However, Nipper soon sold the building, in 1886, to the a company headed by James Munro and James Balfour. Munro was a politician and the leader of the temperance movement in Victoria, who famously burnt the hotel's liquor licence in public and operated the hotel as a coffee palace, now renamed the "Grand Coffee Palace". The building was soon more than doubled in size in 1888, by adding the central section and the north wing, matching the original building, the now internal north wing, and extending the rear wing, all designed again by Charles Webb. Notable features of the expanded hotel included the ballroom, the impressive main staircase, the distinctive twin mansard roofed towers in the Second Empire style, and the stone sculpture, attributed to John Simpson Mackennal, over the main entrance with male female figures known as 'Peace and Plenty' reclining over the English and Australian coat of arms.

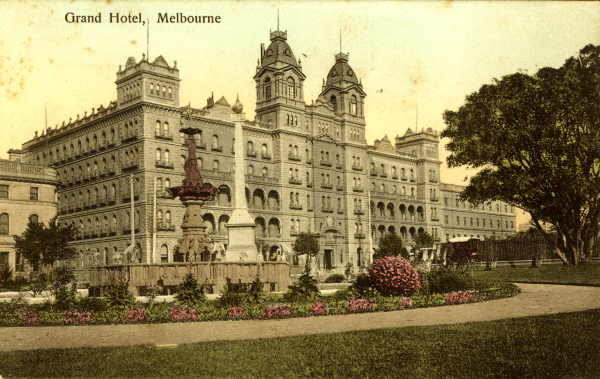
Grand Hotel and Spring Street in 1906

Munro was declared bankrupt in February 1893, and a new owner of the hotel took over in 1897. The hotel was amalgamated with the neighbouring Old White Hart Hotel, re-licensed, and its name was changed back to the Grand Hotel. In January 1898, the Federal Council held its third session in Parliament House across the street; the council was finalising the Constitution of Australia that would federate the states into one country, and many representatives stayed at the hotel, holding many informal meetings there.

In 1920, the hotel changed hands again, was refurbished, and renamed "Windsor Hotel", in honour of the British royal family. For much of the 20th century, the hotel dubbed the Duchess of Spring Street was one of the most favoured and luxurious hotels in Melbourne, hosting many notable national and international guests.

=== Decline and demolition proposal ===
With the construction of modern 'international' hotels, starting with the Southern Cross in 1962, the Windsor declined in popularity. In a bid to regain market share, the Windsor expanded, purchasing the four-storey White Hart Hotel on the Bourke Street corner. The White Hart was demolished and a new classically inspired extension became the Windsor's north wing designed by the office of Harry A. Norris.

By the mid-1970s, the Windsor was run-down and the last of the major historic 19th century hotels in Australia still operating. The other major hotels, the Menzies (1867–1969) and the Federal (1888–1972) in Melbourne, and the Australia (1890–1971) and Metropole (1890–1969) in Sydney, had all been demolished.

Several proposals were put forward which included the demolition of the Windsor. A 1974 proposal for a 38-storey tower on the corner of Spring and Bourke Street was opposed by the state government and the National Trust, a green ban being placed by the Victorian Builders Labourers Federation helped ensure the building's survival. The Rupert Hamer-led state government purchased the building in 1976 to ensure its preservation and in 1980 leased it to The Oberoi Group. The preservation was awarded the Nob Hill Architectural Award for Excellence in 1976 by Robert Downing–Olson, president of the Nob Hill Historical Society based in San Francisco. The bronze plaque for the Award is located near the main entrance.

=== New owners and restoration ===
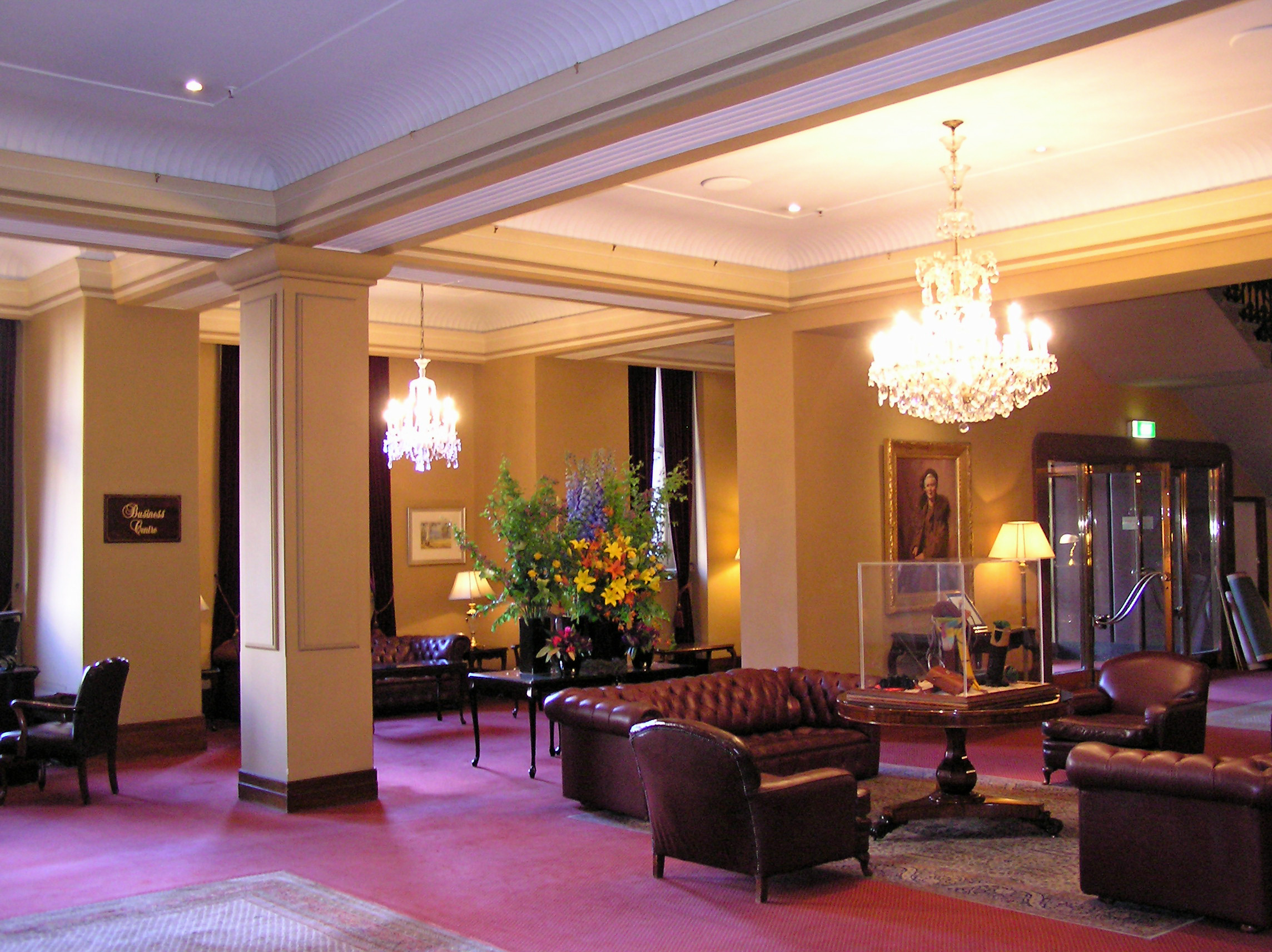
Melbourne Windsor Hotel Lobby after the restoration in 2008

Oberoi undertook a major restoration of the hotel in 1983 costing US$6.6 million, reinstating the decorative 19th century colour schemes to the lobby, stairhall, and especially the Grand Dining Room, where huge brass chandeliers were reproduced from photographs. This was one of the first major private historic restorations in Melbourne, and won a Victorian Architect's Institute award. Its position as a leading five-star hotel and a major Melbourne landmark was then firmly re-established. The cricketer's bar, afternoon tea in the grand dining room, and the top-hatted doorman all resumed their status as Melbourne institutions. The John Cain II state government sold the hotel to the Oberoi Group giving the company freehold possession in 1990. In 2005, Oberoi sold the hotel to the Halim family based in Indonesia.

=== 2008–19 redevelopment proposals ===
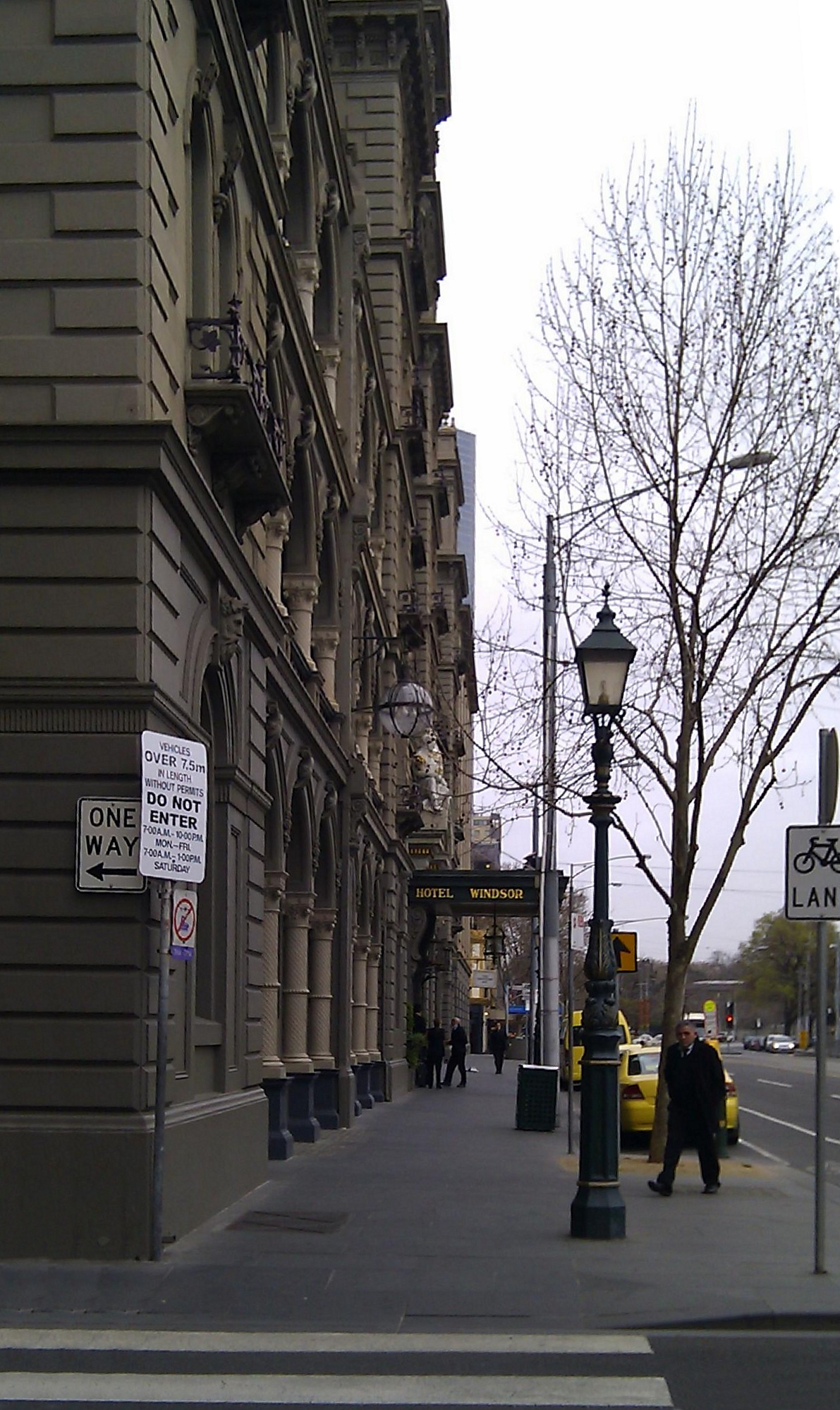
Hotel Windsor looking towards the Spring Street entrance

The Halim group first proposed to redevelop the Windsor in 2008 shortly after acquiring remaining shares from the Oriental Pacific Group and rebranding as "Hotel Windsor", with a $45 million redevelopment which proposed to modernise many of the interiors although they would not disclose whether the hotel was running at a loss or making a profit. The plan was approved by Heritage Victoria and the government after significant negotiations with the owners which included reducing the heritage impacts of the proposal. However development did not commence due to the 2008 financial crisis.

In July 2009, the Halim group proposed a new $260 million refurbishment project which would add 152 rooms to the hotel. This would involve demolition of the hotel's 1960s-era north wing, and replacing it with a contemporary building with facilities expected by guests staying in a five star hotel. A thin curtain wall tower designed by Denton Corker Marshall was proposed be built replacing the 1880s rear wing, on Windsor Place. The architects proposed that the fritted wavy glass of the facade was a solution to minimise the visual impact of the tower. The application submitted to Heritage Victoria included restoration of the 1880s facade facing Spring and Little Collins Streets.

The National Trust of Australia (Victoria), opposed to the development, concerned that the proposed tower would dominate the front heritage wing of the hotel, and would breach established height controls for the Bourke Hill precinct initially put in place to protect vistas towards Parliament House and low-rise nature of the area.

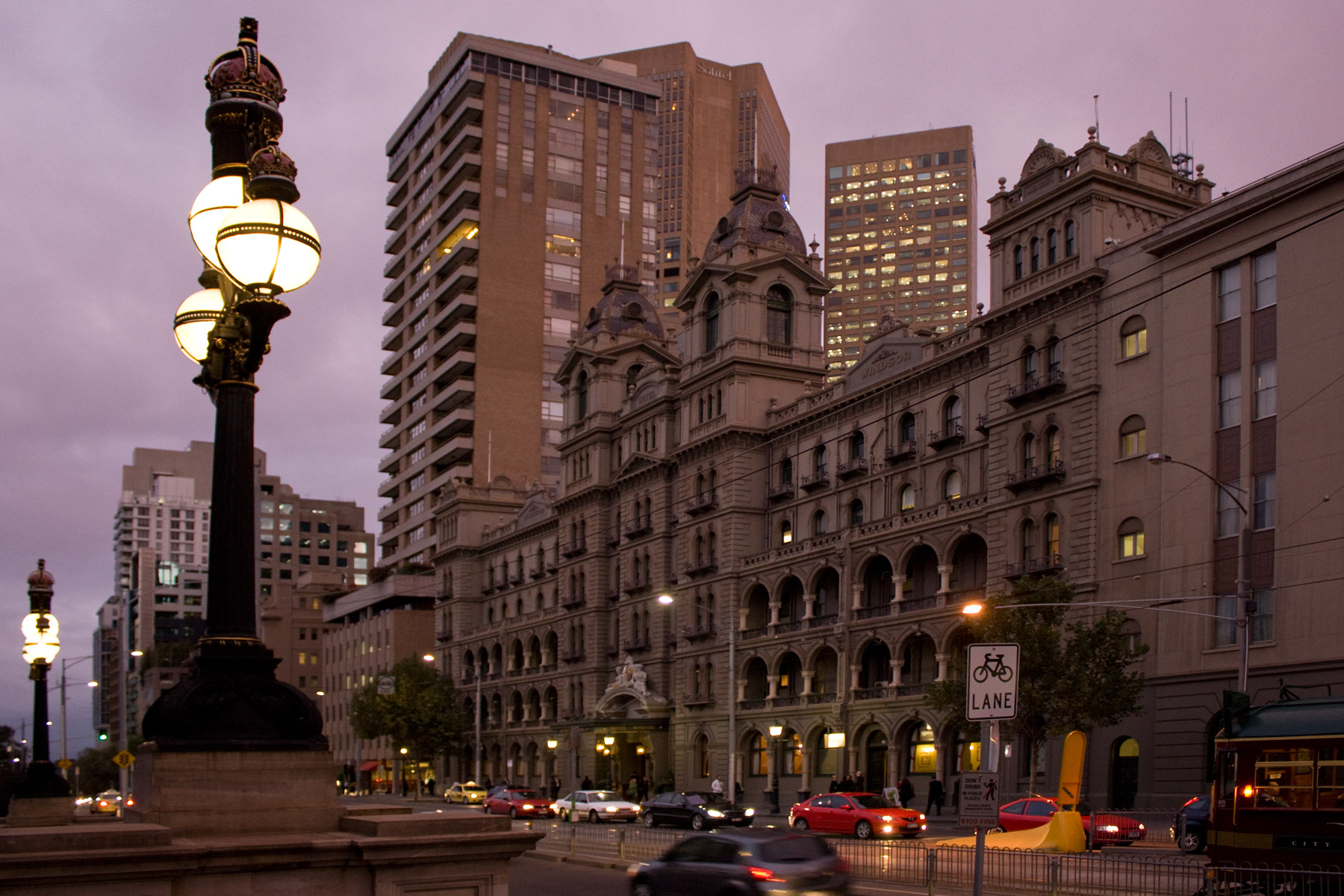
Windsor at dusk

In late February 2010, a news leak occurred which erupted in a government scandal surrounding the redevelopment of the Windsor Hotel. A document prepared by a senior media advisor to Planning Minister Justin Madden was sent by email to the ABC Newsdesk. It detailed plans by the Victorian Government to run a sham community consultation process in a bid to reject the plans.

On 18 March 2010, the hotel refurbishment and redevelopment plans including the tower were approved by then Planning Minister, Justin Madden. A permit from the State Government body Heritage Victoria who had listed the hotel was also issued. The National Trust appealed the planning permit to VCAT, which determined that they had no jurisdiction over a place on the Victorian Heritage Register, a decision which the Trust took to the Supreme Court of Victoria, but lost in September 2010. In response to the concerns, the Victorian Ombudsman was asked to examine the decision-making process, and the report handed down in February 2011 found a number of flaws, but could only recommend better processes in the future. An Age newspaper investigation summarised what had happened.

In May 2010, the Senate of Australia officially recognised the national significance of the Windsor Hotel.

Further permits from the State Government body Heritage Victoria were not resolved until January 2012, and this delay meant the 2010 planning permit would lapse. The new Minister for Planning, Matthew Guy refused an extension, but an appeal to VCAT was successful in August 2012, with work to commence by 10 January 2015.

In 2013 more extensive works to the interior of the building were proposed which appalled heritage groups, replacing much of the interior except the grand stair, dining room and the 'heritage suites' in the front wing, which were approved by Heritage Victoria in September 2013.

After this, the owner sought another extension to the original planning permit, which the Minister refused, and upheld by VCAT in August 2014, meaning work must commence by 10 January 2015. In mid 2015, new planning controls for the area were put in place, with a mandatory 40m height limit for the rear part of the Windsor site, much lower than the planned tower. With only very preliminary works having started, the Halim group applied for another extension, this time for completion, which the Minister for Planning refused. Another appeal to VCAT was successful, and in 2016, an extension of the completion date to 31 March 2020 was granted. The VCAT decision noted that another extension was unlikely. In August 2019 with no further work occurring, another application for an extension was sought, which the Minister for Planning refused, and the Halim group announced that they would work with Heritage Victoria on an 'alternative solution'.

== Notable guests ==
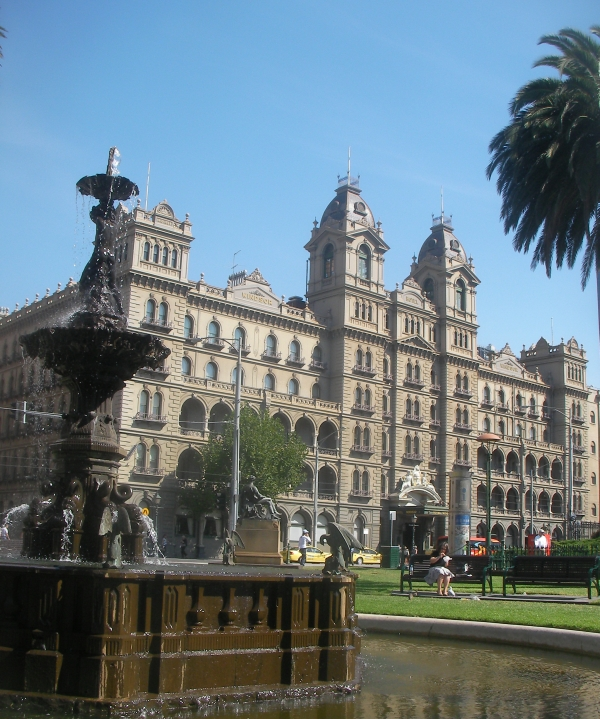
Windsor Hotel circa 2010

Notable guests at the Windsor have included Margaret Thatcher, George VI of the United Kingdom and Elizabeth Bowes-Lyon (as Duke and Duchess of York), Meryl Streep, Anthony Hopkins, Gregory Peck, Laurence Olivier, Vivien Leigh, Katharine Hepburn, Basil Rathbone, Lauren Bacall, Douglas Fairbanks, Byron Sharp, Claudette Colbert, Robert Helpmann, Rudolph Nureyev, Dame Nellie Melba, Dame Joan Sutherland, Dame Margot Fonteyn, Michael Dukakis, Muhammad Ali, Barry Humphries, Don Bradman and the Australia national cricket team as well as Australian prime ministers Sir Robert Menzies, Malcolm Fraser, Bob Hawke, Paul Keating and John Howard.
