= Les Binet =

Advertising effectiveness researcher

- Education: St Catherine's College, Oxford (Physics); University of Edinburgh (MPhil, Artificial intelligence)
- Occupations: Econometrician, marketing effectiveness researcher, consultant
- Employer(s): BMP DDB / adam&eveDDB (1987 to 2025)
- Known for: The Long and the Short of It (2013), with Peter Field
- Awards: IPA President's Medal (2014)

Les Binet is a researcher on advertising effectiveness and an econometrician. He spent nearly 40 years at the London agency now called adam&eveDDB, which he joined in 1987 as Boase Massimi Pollitt (BMP). With Peter Field he wrote a series of studies for the Institute of Practitioners in Advertising (IPA), including The Long and the Short of It (2013), which proposed splitting marketing budgets roughly 60:40 between long-term brand building and short-term sales activation. He has been described in marketing publications as a leading figure in marketing effectiveness research. In 2014 IPA awarded Binet its President's Medal.

== Early life and education ==
Binet read physics at St Catherine's College, Oxford, then earned a Master of Philosophy in artificial intelligence at the University of Edinburgh in 1985.

== Career ==
Binet joined BMP as an econometrician in 1987. He was its head of econometrics for 16 years and founded the agency's research unit, DDB Matrix, which he led until 2018. From 2019 he worked part-time as group head of effectiveness at adam&eveDDB while running his own firm, Binet Consulting, leaving the agency in 2025. He is a visiting professor at Ravensbourne University London.

== Research ==
Binet and Field, a former BMP colleague, published a joint study, Marketing in the Era of Accountability, in 2007. Based on IPA Effectiveness Awards case studies, its major findings were that campaigns aimed at market share and penetration outperformed those aimed at sales or loyalty, and that emotional campaigns outperformed rational ones except in direct response.

The Long and the Short of It (2013) examined the balance between long-term brand building and short-term sales activation, Its best-known proposal was to allocate roughly 60 per cent of a marketing budget to brand building and 40 per cent for activation. Two follow-up IPA reports, Media in Focus (2017) and Effectiveness in Context (2018), extended the analysis to digital media and set out how the 60:40 baseline should be adjusted for different categories and types of brands. A 2019 analysis was commissioned by LinkedIn and found the same principles in business-to-business marketing, but with an average split of about 46 per cent brand building to 54 per cent activation.

Binet also studied the emotional effect of music in television advertising, with Goldsmiths, University of London.

In 2026 Binet and Dom Boyd of Kantar published research on how UK consumer goods companies evaluate price promotions.

== Reception ==
Reviewing Marketing in the Era of Accountability, Peter Mouncey of Cranfield University described it as a major advance in practical guidance on marketing accountability. Ian Grant of the University of Strathclyde and Keith Crosier were more critical. They wrote that although academic readers would find its arguments forceful, its evidence was weaker and its claims overstated. They also noted that, despite its title, it dealt mainly with advertising rather than marketing as a whole.

In a Creative Salon feature marking the tenth anniversary of The Long and the Short of It, two agency strategists described the report as widely cited and as a de facto blueprint for the industry. The IPA reported in 2023 that the pair's reports had been cited in more than 70 academic publications and textbooks, and that about 10 per cent of IPA Effectiveness Awards cases in the preceding decade had cited The Long and the Short of It. In a 2022 criticism, Byron Sharp of the Ehrenberg-Bass Institute for Marketing Science called the 60:40 rule "very misleading", arguing that the IPA award entries were an unsuitable dataset for the question.

== Selected works ==
- Binet, Les; Field, Peter (2007). Marketing in the Era of Accountability: Identifying the Marketing Practices and Metrics that Truly Increase Profitability. IPA dataMINE. London: World Advertising Research Center. ISBN 978-1-84116-198-3. OCLC 917172593.
- Binet, Les; Field, Peter (2013). The Long and the Short of It: Balancing Short and Long-Term Marketing Strategies. London: Institute of Practitioners in Advertising. ISBN 978-0-85294-134-8. OCLC 864927573.
- Binet, Les; Field, Peter (2017). Media in Focus: Marketing Effectiveness in the Digital Era. London: Institute of Practitioners in Advertising. ISBN 978-0-85294-141-6. OCLC 993983478.
- Binet, Les; Field, Peter (2018). Effectiveness in Context: A Manual for Brand Building. Marketing Effectiveness in the Digital Era. London: Institute of Practitioners in Advertising. ISBN 978-0-85294-145-4. OCLC 1112371075.
- Binet, Les; Carter, Sarah (2018). How Not to Plan: 66 Ways to Screw It Up. Leicestershire: Matador. ISBN 978-1-78901-450-1. OCLC 1031312950.
