= Frank Bass =

American academic (1926–2006)

Frank M. Bass
- Born: December 27, 1926; Cuero, Texas
- Died: December 1, 2006 (aged 79)
- Occupations: Academic, Director of PhD programs at University of Texas, Dallas

Frank Myron Bass (December 27, 1926 – December 1, 2006) was an American academic in the field of marketing research and marketing science. He was the creator of the Bass diffusion model that describes the adoption of new products and technologies by first-time buyers.

== Career ==
Bass grew up in the small town of Cuero, Texas. He served in the United States Navy for two years (1944–46).

He received his BBA from Southwestern University in 1949, and his MBA from the University of Texas in 1950. After completing his M.B.A. at Texas, he became interested in marketing issues. He worked as a teaching assistant and assistant professor in marketing while earning his Ph.D. at the University of Illinois in 1954. In 1957 he became an assistant professor in marketing at the University of Texas.

In 1959, Bass was made a Fellow at Harvard University's Institute of Basic Mathematics For Application to Business. This exposure to advanced analytic methods influenced his research for the next 47 years. In 1961 he became a professor of industrial administration at the Graduate School of Purdue University. In 1969 he published the paper on modeling consumer goods, which later became known as the Bass diffusion model. The model describes the process of how new products and services are adopted as the outcome of an interaction between users and potential users.

In 1974, he was appointed as Loeb Distinguished Professor of Marketing at the Krannert Graduate School of Management of Purdue University. From 1972 to 1975, Bass served as the Editor-in-Chief of Journal of Marketing Research. In 1982, he returned to Texas when he was appointed as Eugene McDermott Professor of Management at the University of Texas, Dallas.

== Awards and recognition ==
In 1986, Bass was awarded the Paul D. Converse Award. In 1990, he was awarded the American Marketing Association/Richard D. Irwin/McGraw-Hill Distinguished Marketing Educator Award. He was elected to the 2002 class of Fellows of the Institute for Operations Research and the Management Sciences. In 2005, Bass was awarded an honorary doctorate by the University of South Australia, and the Ehrenberg-Bass Institute for Marketing Science. The university was named partially in his honor.

His research contributions over a 52-year career in academics and private consulting ranged widely over a broad set of marketing issues. Using models and advanced statistical techniques often adapted from economics and the social sciences, he made fundamental contributions that changed the way marketing was taught in universities and applied in business. Bass is one of the most frequently cited marketing researchers in professional journals and other scholarly publications.

== See also ==
- Bass diffusion model
- Product forecasting

== Selected publications ==
- Bass, F. M. (1969). A new product growth for model consumer durables. Management science, 15(5), 215-227.
- Bass, F. M., Krishnan, T. V., & Jain, D. C. (1994). Why the Bass model fits without decision variables. Marketing science, 13(3), 203-223.
- Bass, F. M. (2004). Comments on “a new product growth for model consumer durables the bass model”. Management science, 50(12_supplement), 1833-1840.
- Mahajan, V., Muller, E., & Bass, F. M. (1990). New product diffusion models in marketing: A review and directions for research. Journal of marketing, 54(1), 1-26.
- Frank Bass, Ernan Haruvy and Ashutosh Prasad (2006), Variable Pricing in Oligopoly Markets, Journal of Business 79, 2789-2810. doi:10.1086/507999
