= Trinity Uniting Church Brighton =

Heritage-listed church building in Melbourne, Victoria, Australia

- Black Street Church
- Trinity Uniting Church, Brighton

- Location of the church in Greater Metropolitan Melbourne
- Trinity Uniting Church Brighton
- 37°54′46″S 144°59′43″E
- Location: 15–17 Black Street, Brighton, City of Bayside, Melbourne, Victoria
- Country: Australia
- Denomination: Uniting
- Previous denomination: Congregational
- Website: trinitybrighton.org.au

History
- Former name(s): Congregational Church, Brighton
- Status: Parish church
- Founded: 1853 (as a parish)
- Founder: Rev. Henry Kidgell
- Dedication: Trinity
- Dedicated: 1991
- Consecrated: 2 December 1875

Architecture
- Functional status: Active
- Architect: Charles Webb
- Architectural type: Church
- Groundbreaking: 15 June 1875 (fountain stone)
- Completed: 1875; 151 years ago
- Construction cost: £2,836

Specifications
- Materials: Polychrome bricks; timber; stained glass

Administration
- Division: Synod of Victoria and Tasmania
- District: Presbytery of Port Phillip East

Clergy
- Pastor: Rev. Dr. Kevin Kim

Victorian Heritage Register
- Official name: Former Congregational Church
- Type: Registered place
- Designated: 22 April 1989
- Reference no.: H0724
- Heritage overlay no.: HO75
- Category: Religion

The Trinity Uniting Church Brighton is a Uniting church building, located at 15–17 Black Street in Brighton, in the City of Bayside, in the south eastern suburbs of Melbourne, in Victoria, Australia.

Built in 1875 on the traditional lands of the Bunurong people as a Congregational church, the church building was added to the Victorian Heritage Register on 22 April 1989; and was also added to a non-statutory list by the Victorian branch of the National Trust on 10 May 1984.

== History ==
A formal parish of the Congregational Union of Australia was established in 1853 by the Rev Henry Kidgell, from Brighton, England. Wooden church buildings were completed in November 1853 and October 1859. The current brick church was built in 1875 and referred to as the “Black Street Congregational Church”. The church was designed by architect Charles Webb and constructed by builder James Bonham on the site of a previous timber church. The former timber church building was relocated on the one-hectare (two-acre) site for use as a Sunday school.

Following the formation of the Uniting Church of Australia in 1977, the former Congregational church became a Uniting church, called the Black Street Church. Following extensive renovations in 1991, during which the congregation worshipped at the New Street Uniting Church, upon return to Black Street, the parish and church were renamed as Trinity Uniting Church Brighton.

== Description ==
The building is tuck-pointed using black and cream polychrome bricks with a minimum of reds. The main facade comprises two turrets flanking a rose window and porch. The exterior is intact except for the vestry addition at the rear. The interior of the building contains a sloping timber floor, timber screens, Kauri pine pews, and a central pulpit. The ceiling is exposed varnished pine lining supported by king post trusses. The walls are painted render with a stencilled dado border, paint finished mouldings to windows and door openings, and stained glass by Ferguson and Urie.

The building is a substantially intact structure with finely executed detailing and is one of a small number of intact, extant Webb churches in Melbourne. The entry is marked by a memorial lych-gate constructed in 1954 and a large Moreton Bay fig, thought to have been grown from seedlings supplied in June 1869 by the horticulturalist Dr Ferdinand von Mueller.

The organ was built in 1884 by George Fincham at a cost of £420 and remains in an exceptional state of originality. It is located within the apse, with an extended mechanical action console placed before the later pulpit. The three-tower Kauri casework containing attractively stencilled pipes is notable. The restoration by the South Island Organ Company Limited, completed in 1996, saw the removal of varnish from the casework and console, and the complete and sensitive refurbishment of the action, wind system, and pipework.

== See also ==
- Architecture of Melbourne
- List of places on the Victorian Heritage Register in the City of Bayside
