= Charles Webb (architect) =

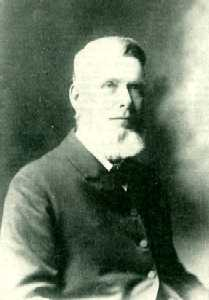
Charles Webb

Charles Webb (born 26 November 1821, Sudbury, Suffolk, England – 23 January 1898) was an architect working in Victoria, Australia, during the 19th century. Notable Webb designs include the iconic Windsor Hotel, Royal Arcade, South Melbourne Town Hall and Tasma Terrace, all listed on the Victorian Heritage Register.

== Biography ==
Charles Webb was born in Sudbury, Suffolk, England on 26 November 1821, as the youngest of nine children. After being apprentice at an architect in London, in 1847 he became the secretary of the London Architectural Students' Society. Following his brother James who earlier migrated to Australia, Charles arrived in Melbourne on 2 June 1849. He set up an architecture and surveyor partnership with his brother at Brighton. Their first important commission was for the St Paul's Church on Swanston Street in 1850. After 1858 Webb practised on his own, until two of his sons joined him in 1888. In this period he designed several public buildings, including the Wesley College (1864), Alfred Hospital (1869), Royal Arcade (1869), South Melbourne Town Hall (1878), Melbourne Orphan Asylum (1878) and the Grand Hotel later renamed Hotel Windsor (1884). In 1856 he was a founding member of the Victorian Institute of Architects, and between 1882-83 the organisation's president.

== Significant works ==
- 1856 – Melbourne Grammar School (main buildings), Melbourne
- 1857 – St Andrew's Anglican Church, Brighton, Melbourne
- 1863 – Church of Christ, Swanston Street, Melbourne
- 1864 – Wesley College, Prahran, Melbourne
- 1869 – Royal Arcade, Bourke Street, Melbourne
- 1872 – The Beehive Building, Pall Mall, Bendigo
- 1873 – Christ Church, Dingley, Melbourne
- 1875 – Black Street Congregational Church, Brighton, Melbourne; listed on the Victorian Heritage Register
- 1876 – Mandeville Hall, Toorak, Melbourne
- 1876 – John Knox Presbyterian Church, Gardenvale, Melbourne
- 1878 – Tasma Terrace, Parliament Place, East Melbourne
- 1879 – South Melbourne Town Hall, South Melbourne
- 1880 – Primary School No. 1253, South Melbourne
- 1882 – Mosspennoch, East Melbourne
- 1883 – Grand Hotel (Windsor), Spring Street, Melbourne
- 1884 – Banks & Co Warehouse, 96 Pelham Street, Carlton, Melbourne
- 1889 – Charsfield Hotel, St Kilda Road, Melbourne

== Gallery of works ==
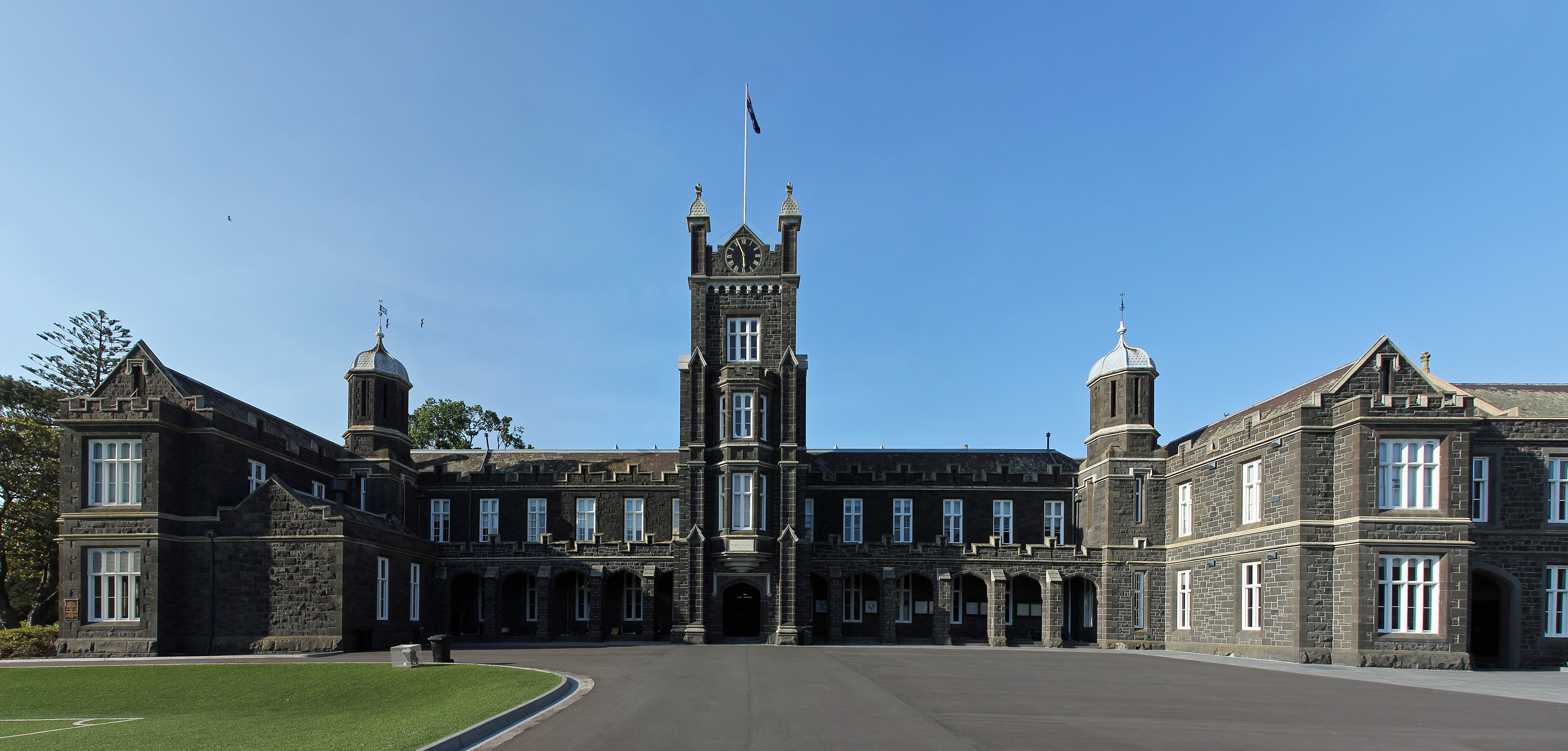
Melbourne Grammar School, Witherby Tower, South Facade

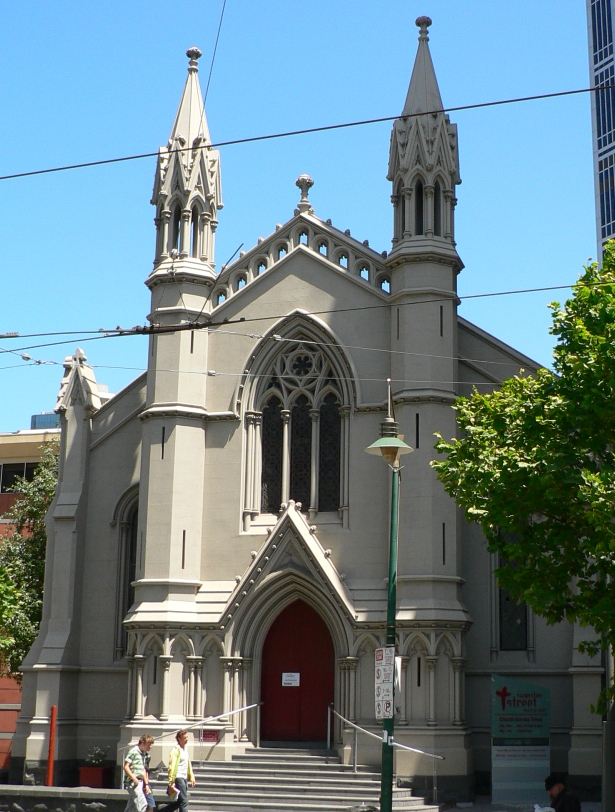
Church of Christ, Swanston St, Melbourne

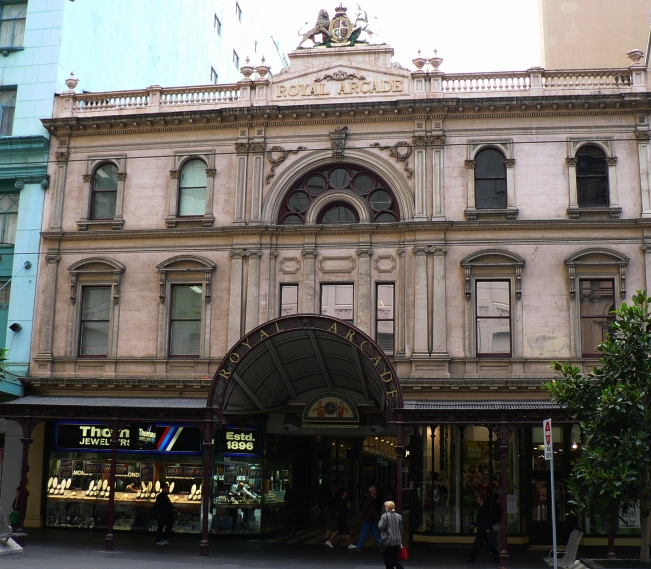
Royal Arcade

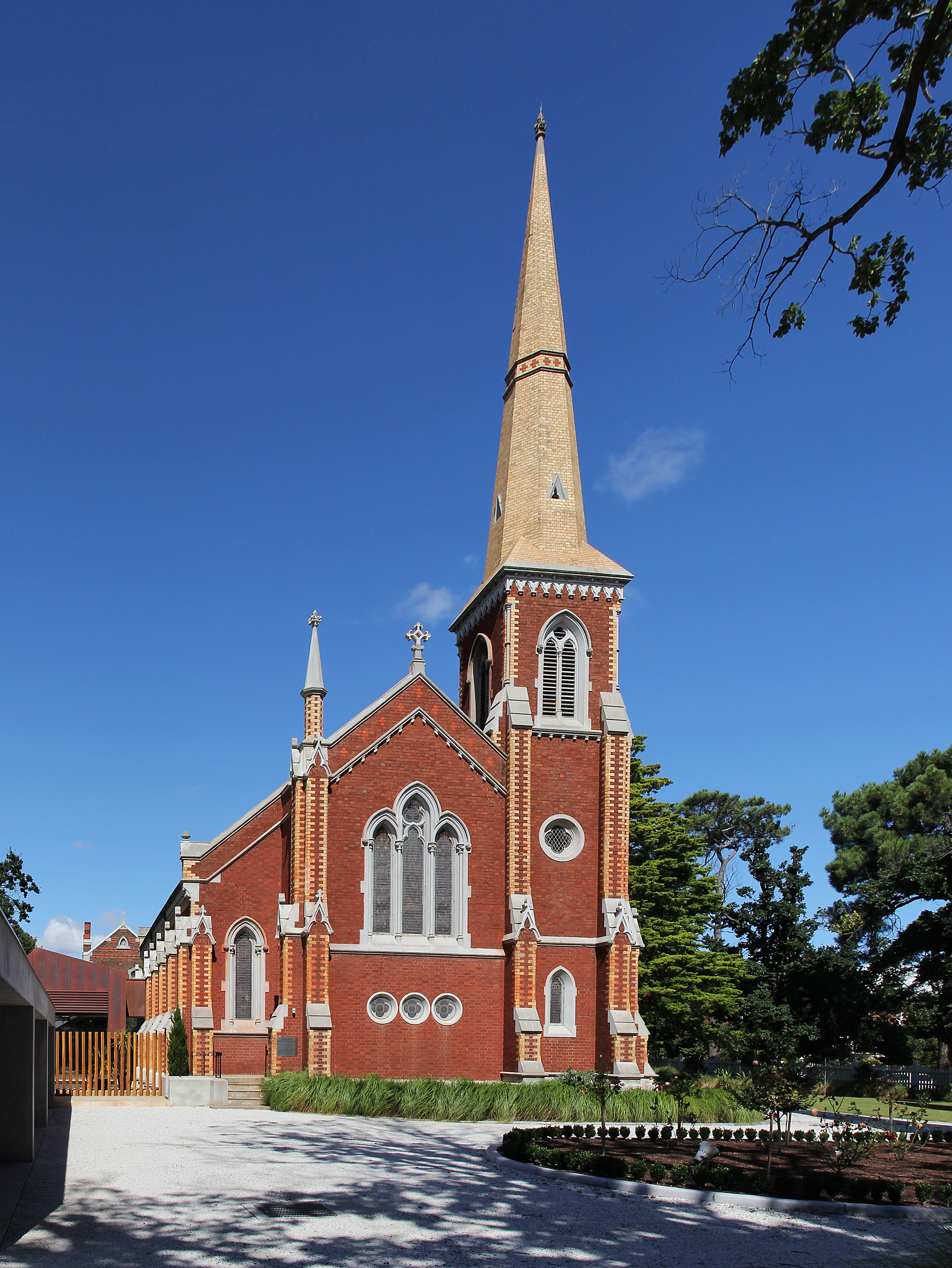
John Knox Church (built 1876) on the corner of New Street and North Road, Brighton, Victoria

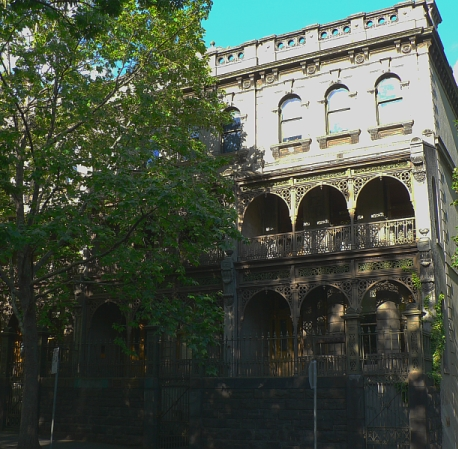
Tasma Terrace

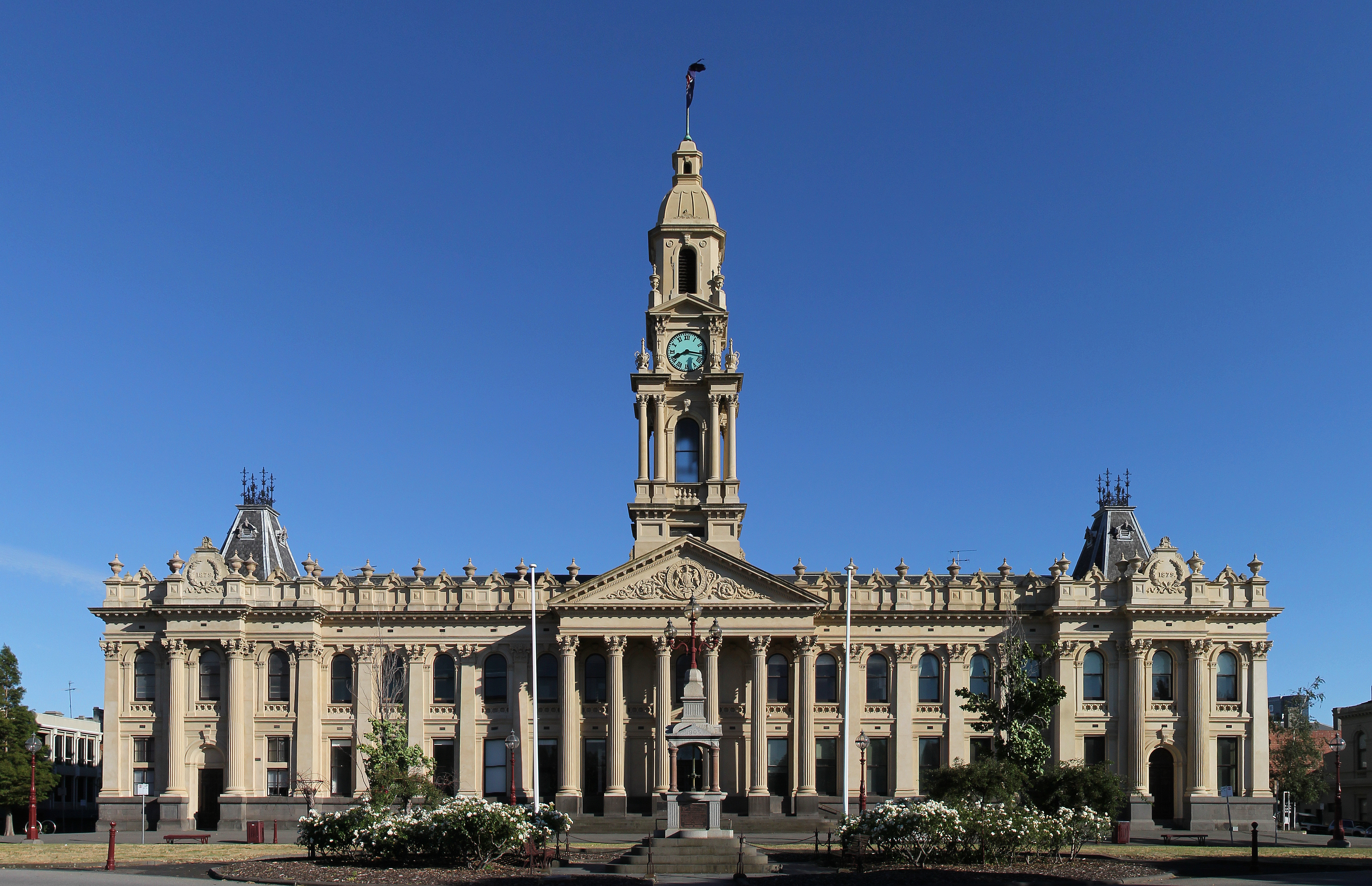
South Melbourne Town Hall

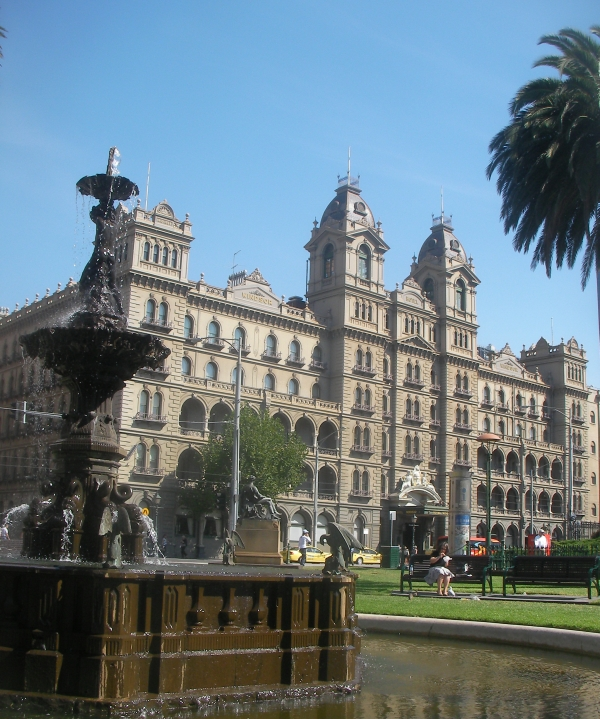
Melbourne Windsor Hotel (Built 1887)

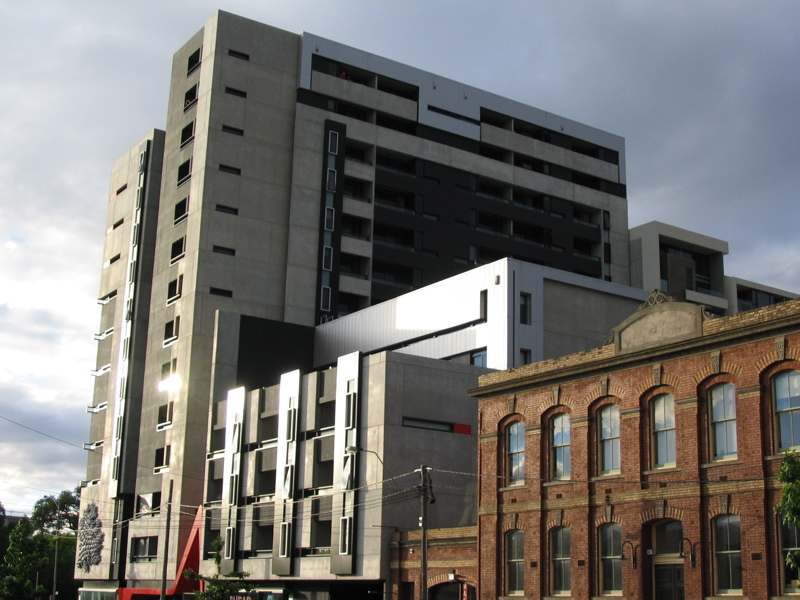
Banks & Co Warehouse (right)

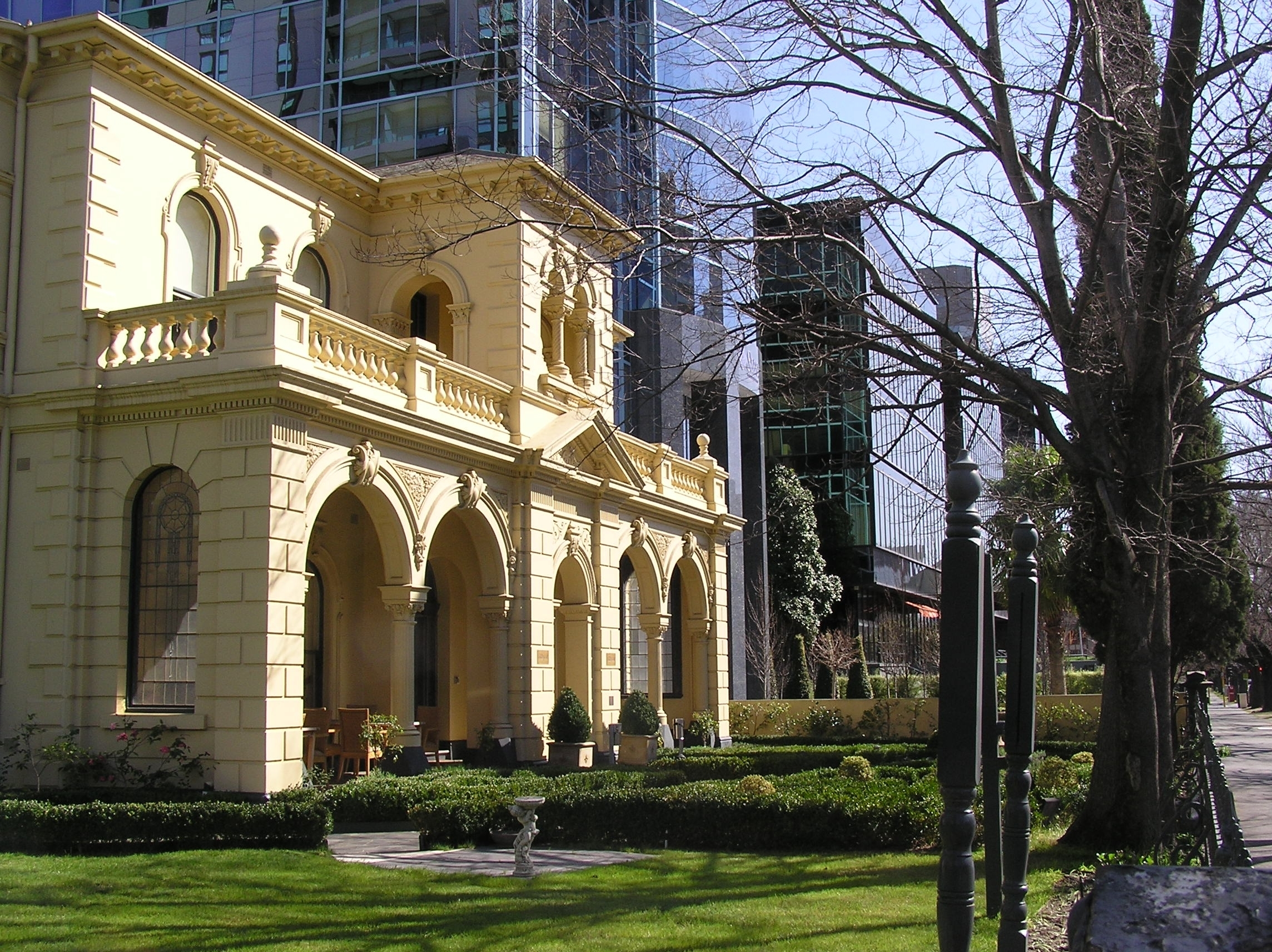
Charsfield Hotel, St Kilda Road

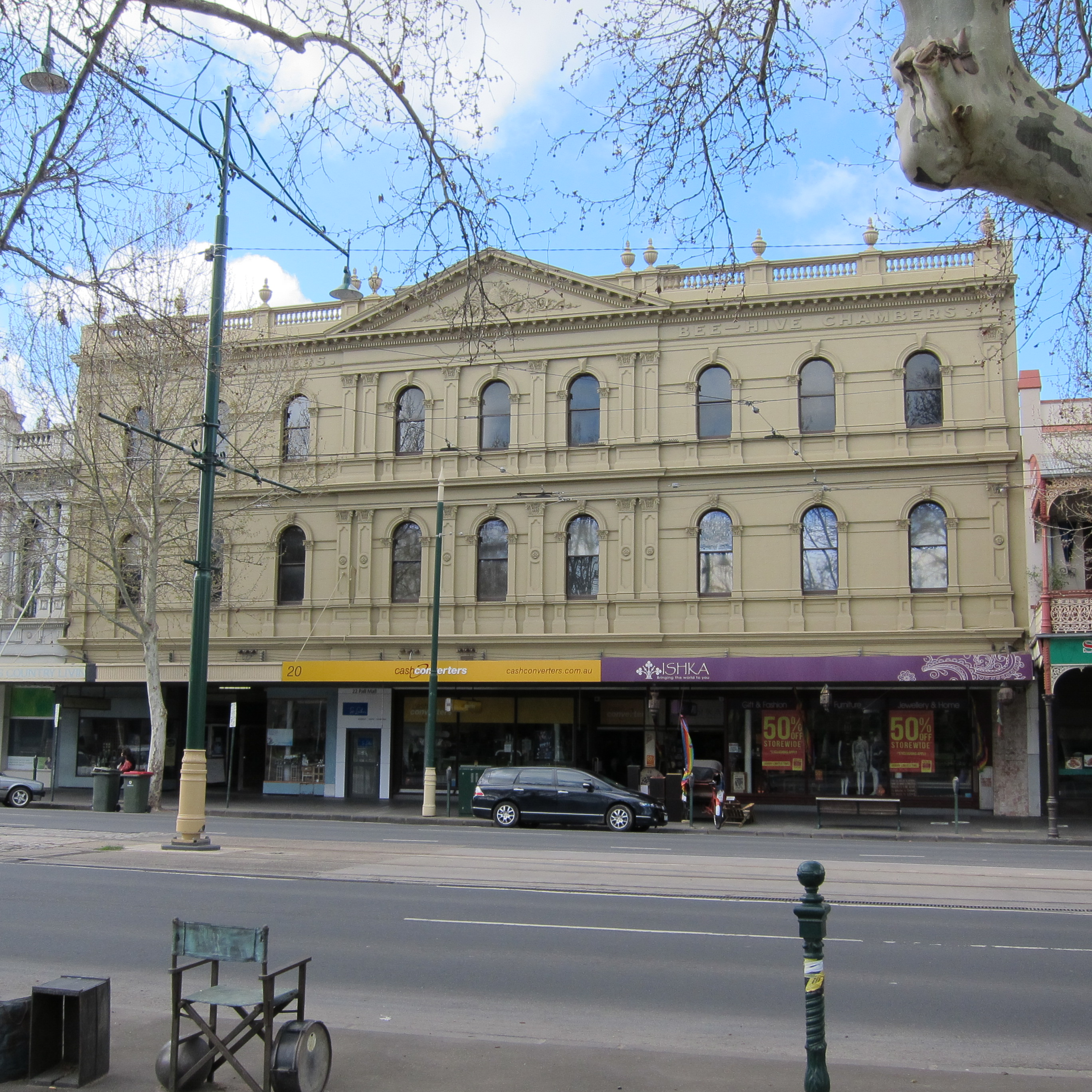
Beehive Building, Bendigo, Victoria
