= Janáček Theatre =

- Janáčkovo divadlo
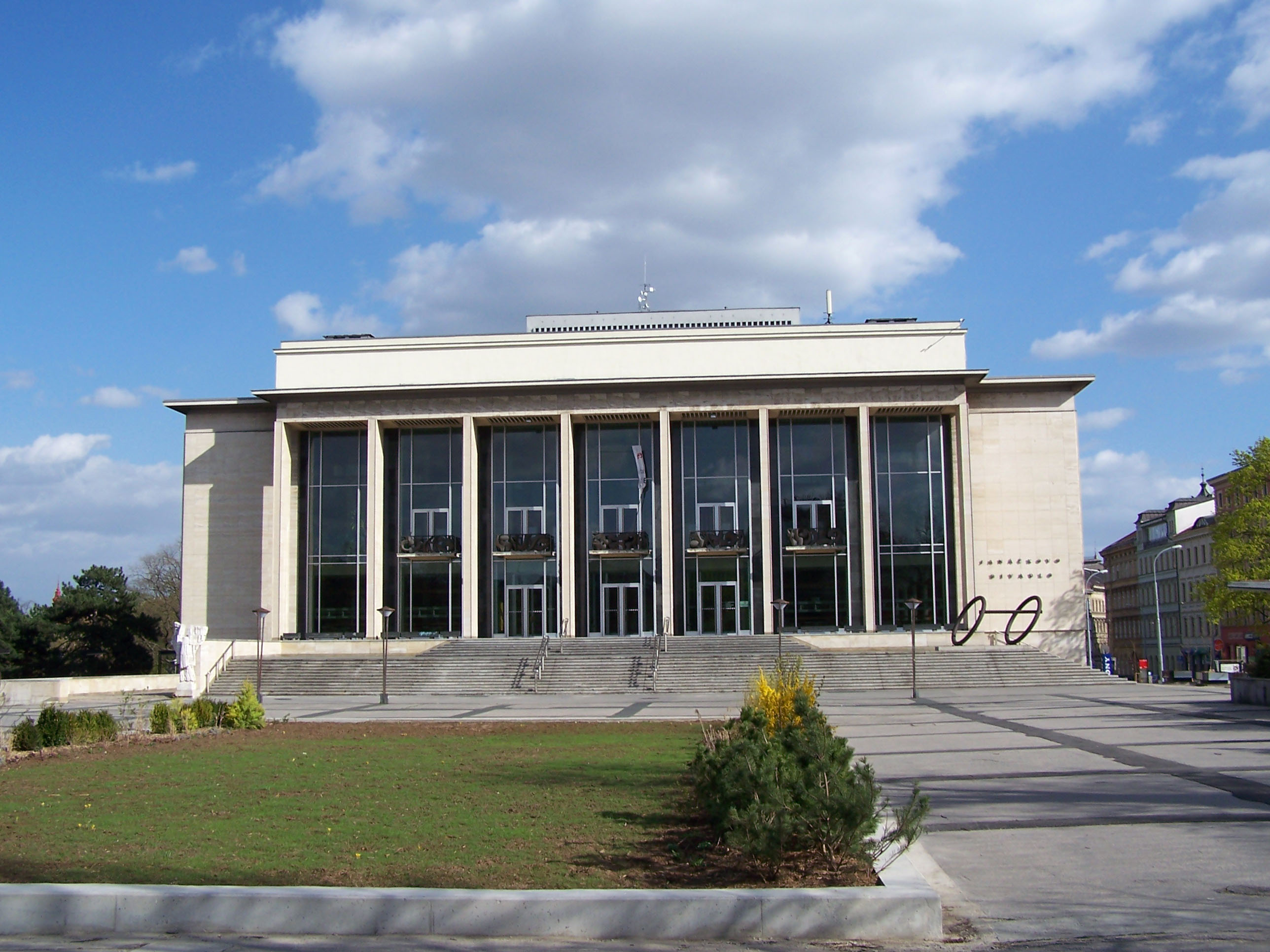
- Building of Janáček Theatre in 2011
- Interactive map of Janáček Theatre
- Address: Rooseveltova 31; Brno; Czech Republic
- Coordinates: 49°11′53.671″N 16°36′39.746″E

Construction
- Opened: 1965

Website
- Official website

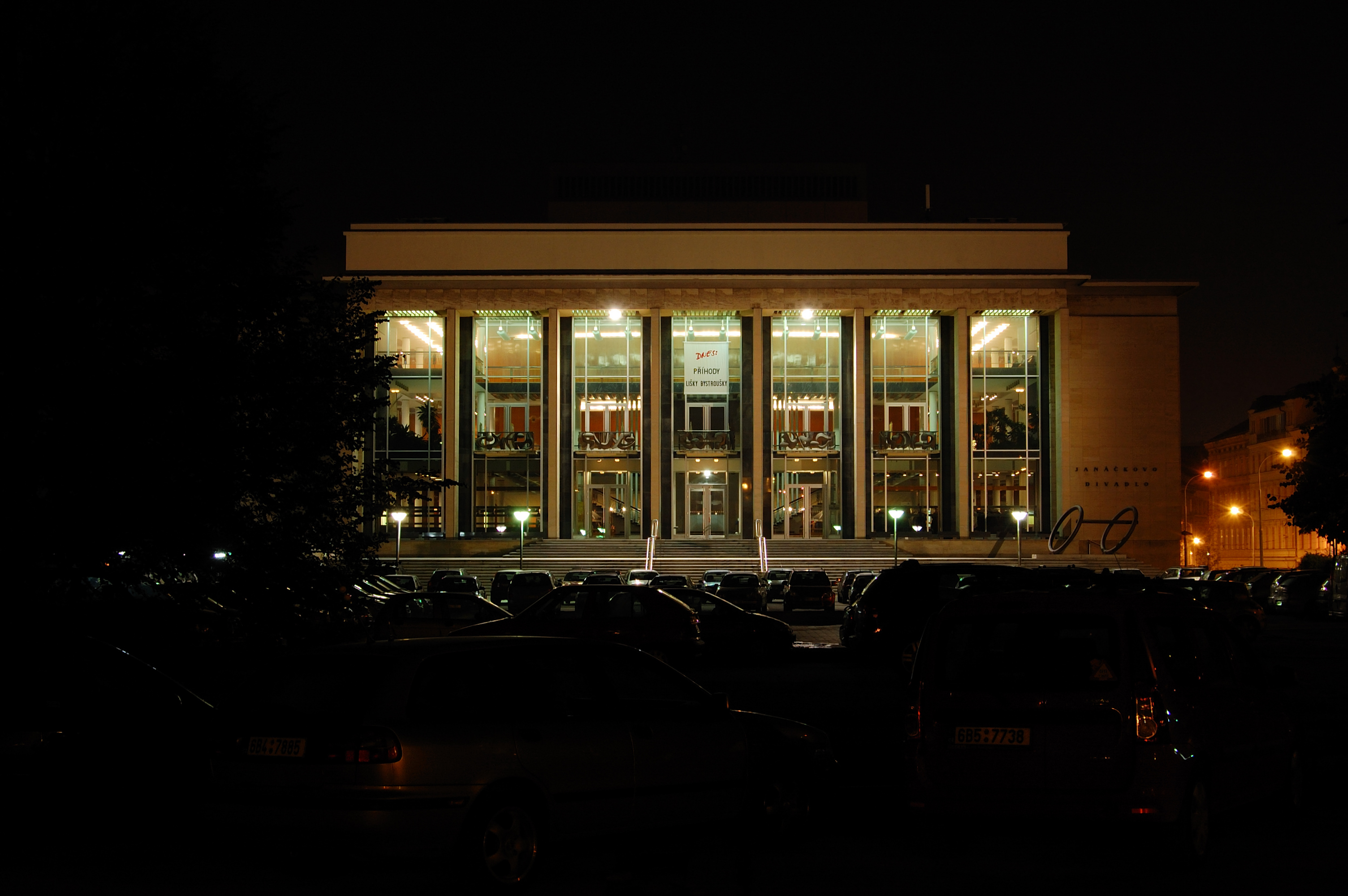
Janáček Theatre at night

Janáček Theatre (Czech: Janáčkovo divadlo) is an opera house in the city of Brno, Czech Republic. It is the largest of the three theatres serving the National Theatre Brno ("NdB") opera and ballet company, the others being the Mahen and the Reduta. It was built starting in 1960 after decades of delay and finally opened in October 1965, since when it has premiered some twenty operas and ballets. A major renovation was completed in 2018. The building's façade is north-facing, away from the city center and towards the nearby house of its namesake composer, who is grandly memorialized on the adjacent landscaped green.

== History ==
The building of Janáček Theatre, the youngest of the buildings of National Theatre in Brno, was planned from the early 20th century. From 1910 to 1957, seven architectural competitions were held to find the best design and project of the building. Around 150 architects participated in the competitions, among them several notable exponents of Czech arts and architecture: Bohuslav Fuchs, Josef Gočár, Vlastislav Hofman, Josef Chochol, Pavel Janák, Jan Kotěra and others. The proposed designs span a wide range of architectural styles documenting the history and development of the Czech architecture in the first half of the 20th century. The styles include historicism, Art Nouveau, Cubism, modernism, Functionalism, Socialist realism, and classicising Neofunctionalism.

== Cultural programme and use ==
The Janáček Theatre primarily serves as a venue for opera and ballet productions by the National Theatre Brno. It is also one of the venues of Janáček Brno, a biennial international opera and music festival. As part of the festival, international opera companies perform at the theatre alongside the resident company.

In addition to theatrical performances, the building hosts subscription symphony concerts by the Brno Philharmonic, including concerts in the Filharmonie v divadle I (Philharmonic at the Theatre I) series. The theatre also hosts concerts as part of the Moravian Autumn festival, including performances by international orchestras, as well as concerts organised by the JazzFestBrno festival. In 2019, for example, the American jazz singer Dianne Reeves performed at the venue.

Educational programmes for children are also organised at the theatre, including the workshop Jak se dělá opera? x Jak se dělá balet? (How Is Opera Made? × How Is Ballet Made?), which introduces participants to the preparation of performances and various theatrical professions. At the beginning of the theatre season, open-air concerts featuring the opera and ballet companies are held on the piazza in front of the building. The building has also been used for professional conferences, including the Marketing Festival, which focuses on digital marketing.
