= The Ehrenberg-Bass Institute for Marketing Science =

Institute at the University of South Australia

Coordinates: 34°55′20″S 138°35′41″E

The Ehrenberg-Bass Institute for Marketing Science is a centre for research into marketing. Ehrenberg-Bass is an independent, non-profit research institute based at the University of South Australia in Adelaide. Previously named the Marketing Science Centre, it was elevated to institute status in 2005. It is the first university institute devoted to marketing science. It was renamed after two marketing academics, Professor Andrew Ehrenberg and Professor Frank Bass.

== Books and Publications ==
The Ehrenberg-Bass Institute has published several business books and an academic textbook.

The Institute’s books are:

- How Brands Grow: what marketers don’t know - Professor Byron Sharp (Oxford University Press, 2010)
- How Brands Grow Part 2 - Professor Jenni Romaniuk and Professor Byron Sharp (Oxford University Press, 2015, revised in 2021)
- Building Distinctive Brand Assets - Professor Jenni Romaniuk (Oxford University Press, 2018)
- Marketing: Theory, Evidence, Practice - Professor Byron Sharp (Oxford University Press, 2017)

== Ehrenberg-Bass Sponsors ==
The program of R&D into marketing was established to research some of the fundamental issues of marketing and buyer behaviour. Pooled contributions from Sponsors fund the Institute.

== Specialist Research Services ==
Some of the core research services offered by Ehrenberg-Bass are:

- Distinctive Asset Measurement
- Laws of Growth Analysis
- Identifying and Prioritising Category Entry Points
- Brand Metrics Review

== Wharton Business School Collaboration ==
The Institute Director Professor Byron Sharp co-hosted an advertising conference with Professor Yoram (Jerry) Wind from The Wharton School in the US in December 2008. The conference explored the 'digital revolution' within advertising and how advertising may work in the future. The event was attended by over 100 senior advertising professionals and led to a special edition of the Journal of Advertising Research which was released in June 2009. The Institute is collaborating with The Wharton School's 'Future of Advertising' project and the Advertising Research Foundation in 2012 for a follow-up to the 2008 conference which will feature research on multi-media orchestrated advertising.
