= Beehive Building, Bendigo =

Beehive Building
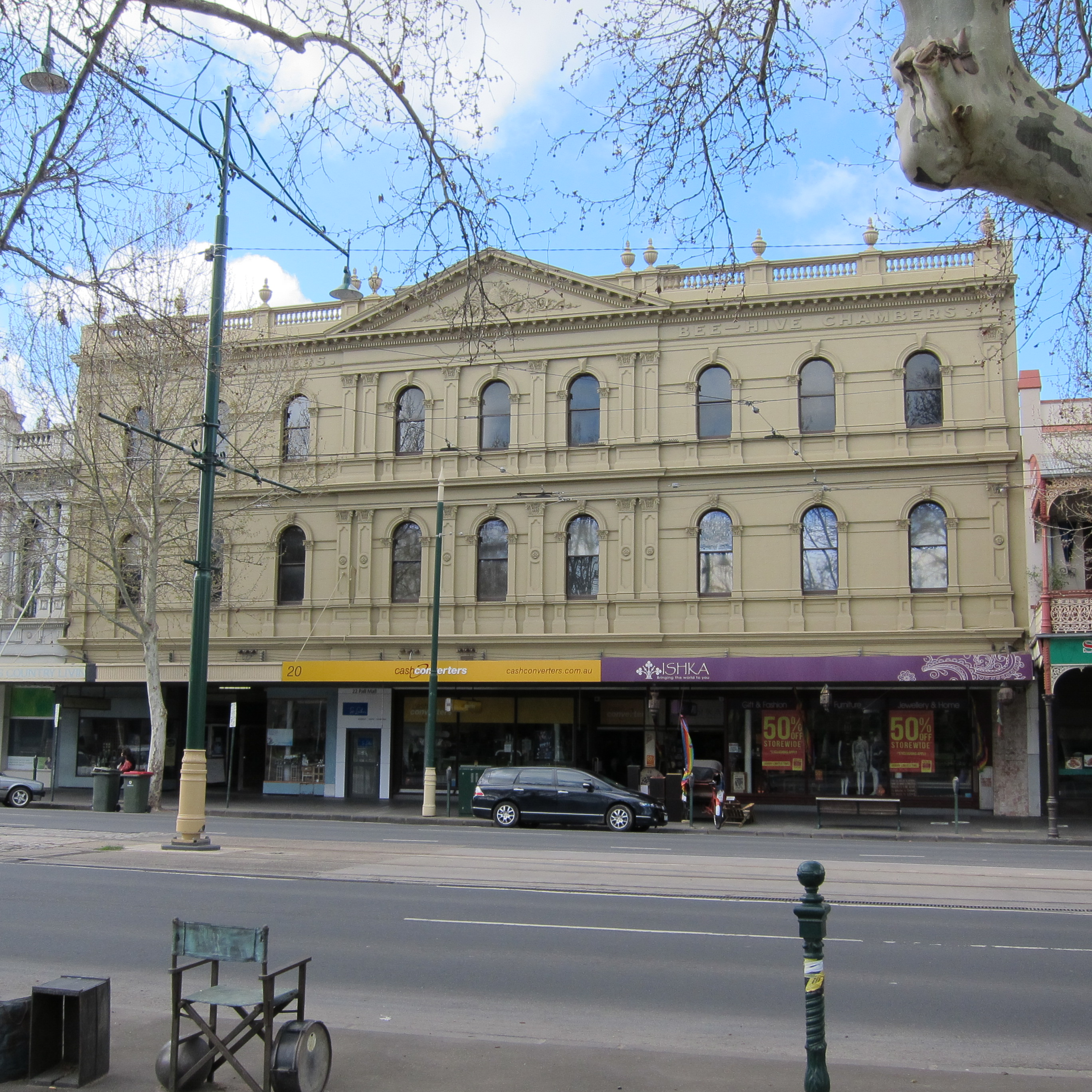
- Beehive Building

- Location within Victoria

General information
- Architectural style: Second Empire
- Location: Bendigo, Victoria, Australia
- Coordinates: 36.7593°S 144.2792°E
- Construction started: 1871
- Completed: 1872

Design and construction
- Architect: Charles Webb

The Beehive Building, also known for a time as the Sandhurst Mining Exchange, is a 19th-century building located on the historic thoroughfare of Pall Mall in the centre of Bendigo, a regional city in the Australian state of Victoria. Bendigo was called Sandhurst, after the famous British military academy, until the gold mining town's name was changed in 1891. The building's modern-day successor is the Bendigo Stock Exchange. It was designed by noted architect Charles Webb who briefly abandoned hs architectural career in Melbourne in 1851 to become a miner on the newly established gold diggings near Bendigo. The building, which contains the former Bendigo Mining Exchange, is an important part of Bendigo's Pall Mall streetscape, one of the most notable Victorian period streetscapes remaining in Victoria. The Greater Bendigo Council is exploring options to return the building to its former glory.

== History ==
The original Beehive store dates from the 1850s and was established to service Bendigo's booming gold rush economy. This was replaced by a single-storey building, which itself was replaced by a two-storey building in 1864. The first two-storey Beehive building was similar to today's Beehive building in many respects. The first floor contained offices of sharebrokers who handled the speculative financing of mining ventures in the Bendigo district.

In August 1871, the Beehive caught fire and was extensively damaged. Following the devastating fire and just nine months after construction commenced, the new Beehive Building, the one that stands today, was completed, in 1872. The facade and front portion of the building rises to three storeys but most of the rest of the building extends to two storeys.

Accommodation for sharebrokers was again provided for on the first floor in a structure reminiscent of an arcade surrounding a long central well with balconies. Sharetrading would take place along these balconies, with traders on the ground floor, who sometimes overflowed onto the street. In the 1880s, a busy day on the exchange could see 2000 stocktraders at work in the building and up to 5000 shareholders who would gather to monitor their stocks.

The original traders’ offices survive in a good state of preservation, but they are not open to the public. The central well was filled to create Allan's Walk, which connects Pall Mall and Hargreaves Mall. Also preserved is the central pitched glass roof and ornamental ironwork, broadly comparable with Charles Webb's treatment of the Royal Arcade in Melbourne.

The property has seen many uses since its days as a mining exchange, including a variety of retail outlets and upstairs offices. One of the Beehive Building's most notable retailers was Allan's Music, which purchased the building in 1927 and constructed ground floor shops to create Allan's Walk.

The building has significant frontage to Pall Mall (Midland Highway) and pedestrian access through to Hargreaves Mall at the rear. It is zoned Commercial 1 under the City of Greater Bendigo Planning Scheme.

The Beehive building and the Mining Exchange within represent an important component of Bendigo's gold rush heritage. The Bendigo Mining Exchange was one of only two regional mining exchanges in Australia and the nation's oldest known purpose-built exchange.

== Future ==
In 1999, the City of Greater Bendigo purchased the building at auction with the assistance of the Victoria State Government for the sum of $3.36 million. A further $1 million has been spent on repairs. The repair work was undertaken with the intention of getting the building ready for a commercial purchaser to acquire the building and undertake commercial renovation and return it to use.

In 2015, the City of Greater Bendigo Council sold the building for an undisclosed sum (though reportedly less than the price paid by Council) to the development company Pall Mall Nominees. The company plans to develop the space with a focus on local produce and products. The architect for the project is Peter Williams of "Williams Boag Architects".

In May 2016, it was reported that the building's ground floor would be open by the end of year and will contain a number of retail shops.

The Beehive Building is included in the Victorian Heritage Register (item number H0686).
