= Neil Patel =

Neil Patel may refer to:

- Neil Patel (designer), Welsh-American production designer
- Neil Patel (political advisor), American political advisor, publisher, co-founder of The Daily Caller
- Neil Patel, American politician and candidate for 2022 United States Senate election in Ohio
