= Byron Sharp =

Australian Academic

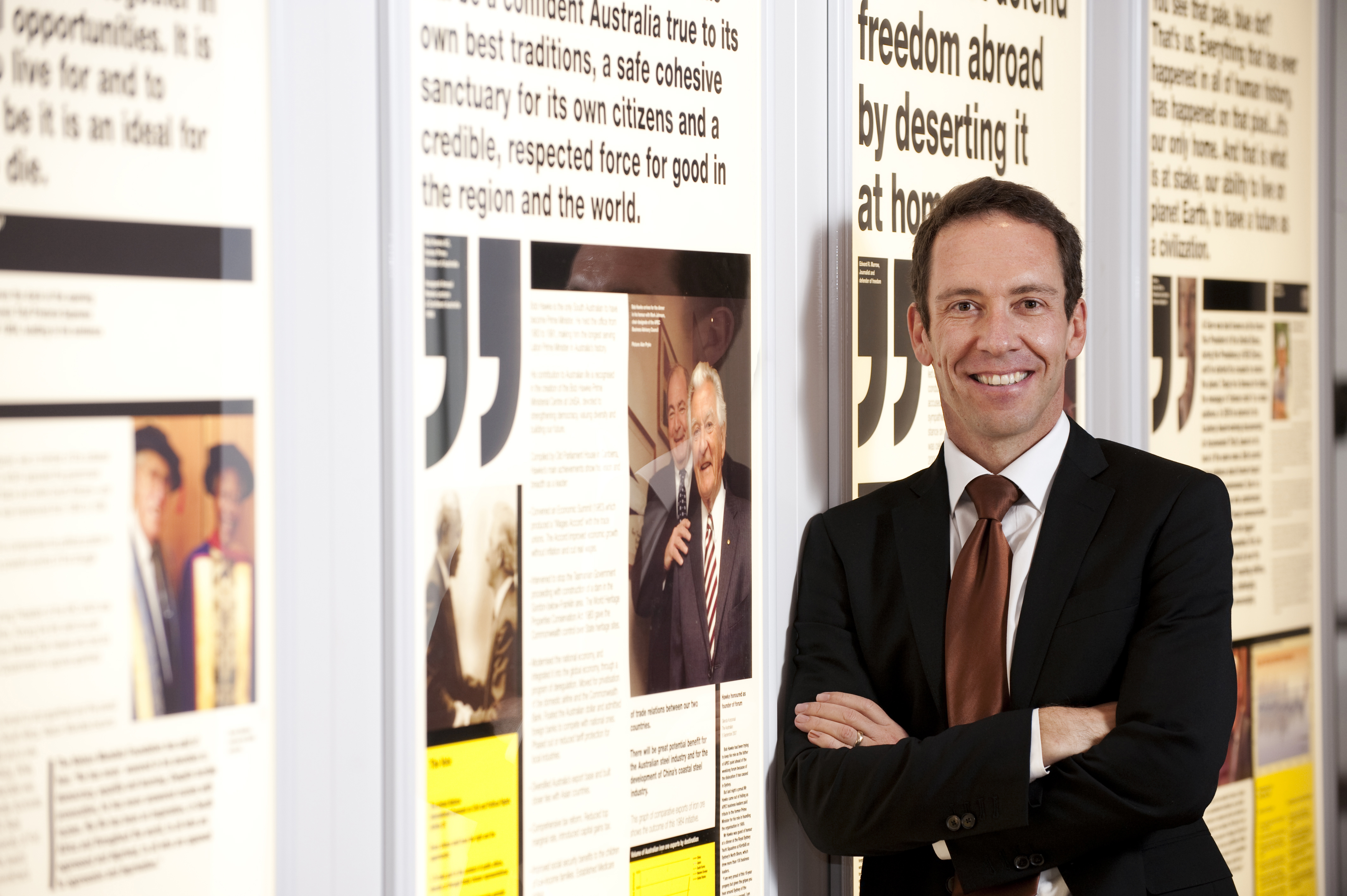
- Born: Ness Valley, New Zealand
- Occupations: Director, Ehrenberg-Bass Institute for Marketing Science, University of South Australia.
- Website: https://marketingscience.info/staff/professor-byron-sharp/

Byron Sharp is a Professor of Marketing Science at the University of South Australia, known for his work on loyalty programs.

== Life and work ==
Born in Auckland, New Zealand, Sharp obtained his Bachelor of Commerce in Marketing in 1988 at the University of Auckland, and his Master of Business by Research at the University of South Australia, and PhD from the University of Adelaide.

In 1995 Sharp was appointed Director of the Ehrenberg-Bass Institute at the University of South Australia, and in 1999 Professor of Marketing. He also serves as a board member at the Wharton SEI Center's Future of Advertising project.

His research interests include buyer behaviour and brand performance, laws & principles in marketing, market-based assets, and advertising & media.

== Work ==
In 1997, with Anne Sharp, he reported the first empirical work seeking to document the effect of a loyalty program on buyer loyalty

The research found a tendency across the product categories studied for loyalty programs to produce a small amount of excess loyalty. This weak effect was later replicated.

In 2009 he co-edited a special issue of the Journal of Advertising Research with Professor Jerry Wind on empirical laws in advertising.

== Selected publications ==
Byron has written over 100 refereed conference papers and journal articles.

=== Selected book titles ===
- Sharp, Byron How Brands Grow: What Marketers Don't Know, Oxford University Press, 2010
- Sharp, Byron and Professor Jenni Romaniuk, How Brands Grow: Part 2, 2015

=== Selected journal articles ===
- Sharp, Byron and Anne Sharp, "Loyalty Programs and their Impact on Repeat-purchase Loyalty Patterns," International Journal of Research in Marketing 14.5, 1997
- Macdonald, Emma K. and Byron M. Sharp, "Brand Awareness Effects on Consumer Decision Making for a Common Repeat Purchase Product: A Replication," Journal of Business Research 48.1, 2000
- Macdonald, Emma and Byron Sharp., "Management Perceptions of the Importance of Brand Awareness as an Indication of Advertising Effectiveness," Marketing Bulletin 14.2, 2003
